= Peter Kurer =

Swiss manager and lawyer

- Born: 28 June 1949 (age 75); Zurich, Switzerland
- Occupation(s): former chairman of Sunrise Communications former chairman of UBS;

Peter Kurer (born 28 June 1949) is a Swiss manager and lawyer. He was chairman of UBS from April 23, 2008, until his dismissal in 2009. He chaired the corporate responsibility and strategy committees of UBS . From April 2016 until April 2020 he was chairman of Sunrise Communications.

== Education ==
Kurer graduated with a licenciate in law from the law school of the University of Zürich and also holds a doctorate in law from the same school and an LL.M. degree from the University of Chicago Law School. He clerked at the District Court of Zürich and was admitted as an attorney-at-law in the Canton of Zürich.

== Career ==
From 1980 to 1990, Kurer practiced as an attorney with the Zürich office of the international law firm Baker McKenzie, first as an associate and later as a partner. From 1991 to 2001, Kurer was a partner at the Swiss law firm Homburger in Zürich.

In 2001, Kurer was appointed group general counsel and member of the group managing board of UBS and in 2002, he was appointed member of the executive board. On 1 April 2008, UBS announced that he would become chairman of the board of directors, replacing Marcel Ospel. On 4 March 2009, UBS announced that Kurer would step down as chairman of the board in April and that Kaspar Villiger would be nominated to succeed him.

From April 2016 until April 2020 he was chairman of Sunrise Communications.

== Awards and honours ==
Kurer is a member of the visiting committee to the Law School of The University of Chicago. He is also a member of the board of trustees of a foundation that acts as an advisory board to the University of St Gallen Program for Law and Economics, and a member of the committee of continuing education, Executive School of Management, Technology and Law, at the University of St Gallen.
