= Münzhof =

Building in Zurich, Switzerland

Coordinates: 47.371914°N 8.538241°E

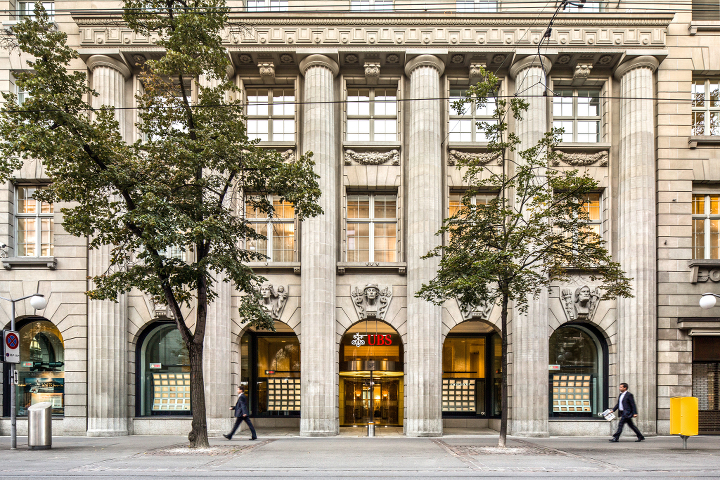
- Pictured in 2012
- Interactive map of the Münzhof area

General information
- Location: Zurich, Switzerland, Bahnhofstrasse 45
- Completed: 1917 (109 years ago)

Münzhof is a historic building in Zurich, Switzerland. Located on Bahnhofstrasse, between St. Peterstrasse and Pelikanstrasse, it was built in 1917 as a branch of the Union Bank of Switzerland (today's UBS). It is now part of the company's headquarters, having relocated from Winterthur and St. Gallen in 1945. It reopened in 2018 following a renovation.
