= Phillips & Drew =

British stockbroking partnership and company

- Company type: Acquired
- Industry: Financial services
- Predecessor: G.A. Phillips & Co. (1895–1905)
- Founded: 1895
- Defunct: 1986
- Fate: Acquired by Union Bank of Switzerland, later merged with Swiss Bank Corporation
- Successor: UBS Phillips & Drew; Phillips & Drew Fund Management; UBS Global Asset Management
- Headquarters: London, England
- Products: Stock brokerage, Mutual funds, Equity research
- Number of employees: 593 (1986)

Phillips & Drew was a large stockbroking partnership and company based in the City of London, England. It was fully acquired by the Union Bank of Switzerland in 1986, which itself merged with the Swiss Bank Corporation in 1998, to become UBS AG.

== History ==
=== Founding and early history ===
In 1885, George Allen Phillips became a member of the London Stock Exchange. After several unsuccessful partnerships, Phillips formed a partnership with his chief clerk, Harvey Richard ('Dick') Drew, to form G.A. Phillips & Co. in 1895. The name of the firm was changed to Phillips & Drew in 1905.

In 1905, the firm assumed the Phillips & Drew name with the arrival of Geoffrey Harvey Drew, Dick's brother, as a new partner and the retirement of Phillips (though he rejoined the firm in 1907). Until the late 1940s, the Drew family continued to hold a controlling position within the firm.

=== 1936–1984 ===
The firm remained relatively small with business dependent upon individual clients until the arrival of Sidney Perry, who joined the firm as a partner in 1936. Perry, would rise to the leadership of the firm over the next decade and by the beginning of the 1950s, he was running Phillips & Drew. Under Perry's leadership, the firm shifted its focus from retail brokerage business toward institutional investors. The firm began to derive most of its income in dealing in gilts, a type of British government bond, for institutions. Perry also instituted a merit-based hiring and promotion system, moving away from hiring on the basis of family or personal connections. The firm grew to over 350 employees by the end of the 1960s.

Also, under Perry, the firm began to establish a reputation as a leading source of equity research and investment analysis.

=== Acquisition by Union Bank of Switzerland ===
In November 1984, Union Bank of Switzerland, predecessor of today's UBS acquired a 29.9% minority interest in Phillips & Drew and two years later announced an acquisition of the firm. At the time of the acquisition, Phillips & Drew, with 60 partners and 593 staff, was the leading dealer of gilts (as a GEMM), convertible bonds and other fixed income securities in the U.K. The firm was also a leading asset manager.

UBS merged their UBS Securities arm with P&D and transferred operations from the stock exchange building, and 100 Moorgate to new premises in the Broadgate development. UBS initially had issues integrating Phillips & Drew, which it had renamed UBS Phillips & Drew (UBS P&D). The firm lost £15 million when a rush of orders overwhelmed the firm’s settlement system in 1987. Then the bank lost £48 million as a result of Philips & Drew positions in the October 1987 stock market crash. Between April 1987 and February 1988, UBS was required to spend as much as £115 million to shore up Phillips & Drew. Phillips & Drew unit returned to profitability in 1992 after years of losses. Due to its performance issues, the Phillips & Drew name was discontinued by 1992 and the business was renamed UBS Limited. However, the Phillips & Drew name was retained in the asset management business that became known as Phillips & Drew Fund Management.

== See also ==
- Union Bank of Switzerland
