= Marcel Ospel =

Swiss banker and head of UBS (1950–2020)

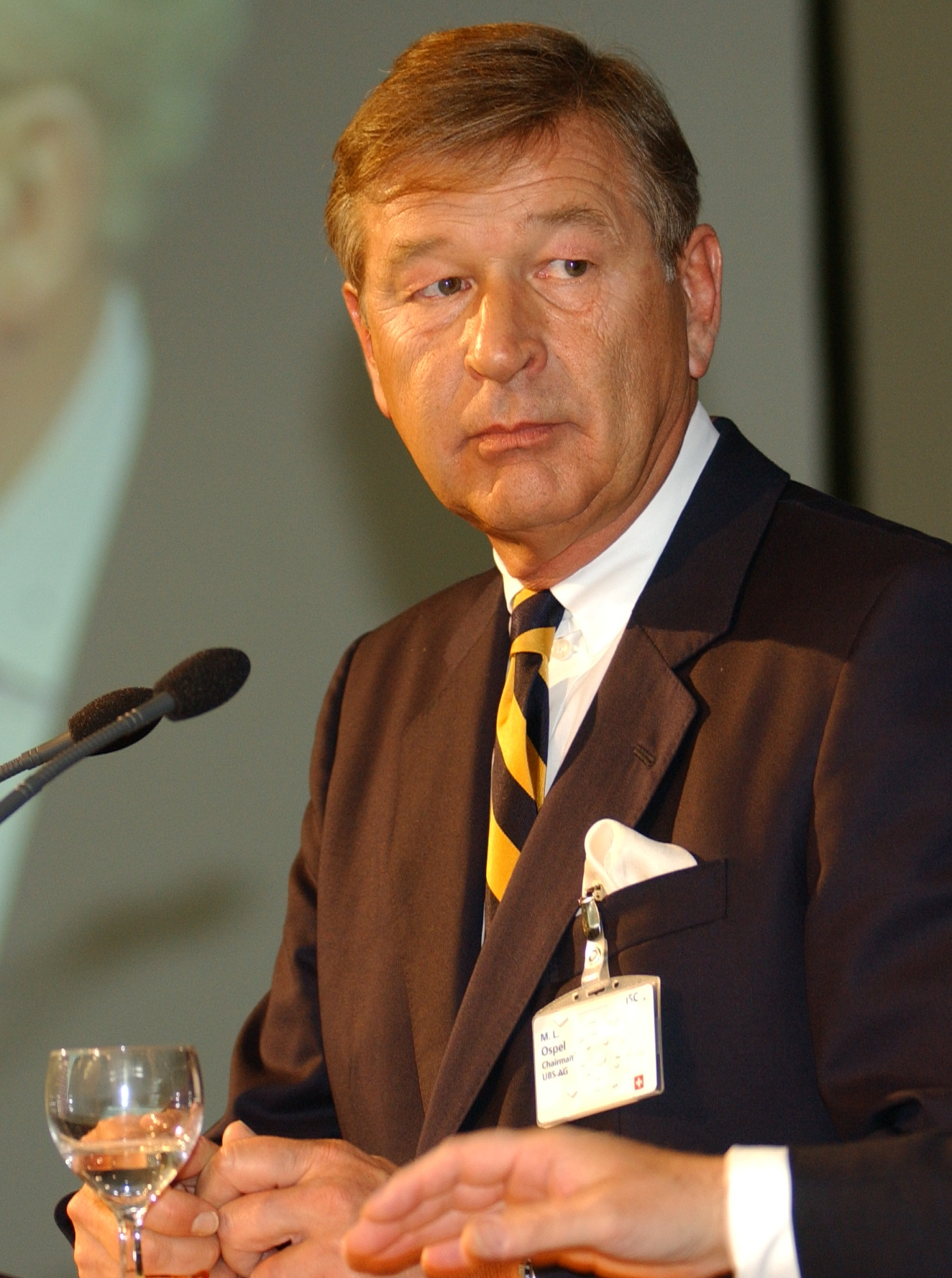
- Ospel at the St. Gallen Symposium in 2003
- Born: Marcel Louis Ospel; February 8, 1950; Basel, Switzerland
- Died: April 26, 2020 (aged 70); Wollerau, Switzerland
- Occupation: Banker
- Known for: Former CEO and chairman of UBS
- Spouses: Margot Baur (m. 1973; div. 1994) Andrée Cécile Koechlin (m. 1995; div. 2002) Adriana Cornelia Bodmer (m. 2006)
- Children: 6

Marcel Louis Ospel (8 February 1950 – 26 April 2020) was a Swiss investment banker and executive, and the longtime CEO and chairman of UBS. With an estimated net worth of 150–200 million Swiss francs, he was among the wealthiest Swiss citizens.

== Early life and education ==
Ospel was born 8 February 1950 in Basel, Switzerland, the oldest of three children, to Louis Ospel, a confectioner turned businessman, originally from Germany, and his wife Doris. He was raised in a modest household in Kleinbasel, the industrial and Rhine port area of town.

He dropped out of school and ultimately started a banking apprenticeship in 1965 at the local branch of French bank Transvalor. After gaining first work experience in Basel, Geneva and London, he studied economics at HWV Basel (currently FHNW), graduating with a diploma in 1977.

== Career ==
Ospel, then aged 30, worked for Merrill Lynch Capital Markets between 1980 and 1984 in London and New York; then became the Managing Director of its Swiss branch in Zurich from 1984 to 1987.

Ospel joined the marketing and planning division of the Swiss Bank Corporation (SBC) shortly after graduating. He rose to become the bank's head and the architect of its 1998 merger with the Union Bank of Switzerland to what is now UBS. The new bank, of which he became CEO, was then the second-largest bank in the world.

Ospel stepped down as CEO in 2001 to become chairman of the board of directors, but retained tight operational control over UBS. In this role, he refused to continue financing the ailing national airline Swissair and was considered by many to share responsibility for its collapse in 2001. His annual salary of up to CHF 26 million – exceptional in Switzerland but less so in international banking – was another topic of frequent controversy during his tenure as chairman.

In the 2000s, Ospel pursued an aggressive growth strategy in investment banking and structured finance, acquiring Paine Webber among others, and was considered to be one of the most powerful men in Switzerland. But his strategy resulted in CHF 80 billion of losses to UBS with the collapse of UBS's Dillon, Read & Co. investment bank during the 2008 financial crisis. Ospel was forced to resign in April 2008, following pressure by the Swiss Financial Market Supervisory Authority, and UBS had to seek a government bailout in October 2008.

In retirement, Ospel remained active as a private investor, but remained a target of public criticism and occasional protests on account of his former salary and his leadership of UBS.

== Personal life ==
In 1973, Ospel married Margot Baur. The marriage ended in divorce. They had two children:

- Dominique Francette Ospel (born 1978), a businesswoman in the fashion industry.
- Philipp "Phil" Ospel(l) (born 1981), an actor and writer.

In 1995, Ospel married Andrée Cécile Koechlin, a daughter of Peter Koechlin and Muriel Koechlin (née von Wyttenbach), of the Swiss line of the Koechlin family who belonged to Basel's milieu of rich families, the Daig. Her mother belonged to Bernese patrician families. In 2002, they divorced before the birth of their son. They have two children:

- Donald Ospel (born 2002)
- Séverine Ospel (born 2003)

On 26 May 2006, aged 56, Ospel married Adriana Cornelia Bodmer (born 1976), a then 30-year-old economist. On 1 January 2009, she gave birth to twins:

- Rubina Ospel (born 2009)
- Benjamin "Benny" Ospel (born 2009)

Ospel was an avid deer hunter and owned a hunting estate in Austria. During the Carnival of Basel, Ospel usually played the Basel drum. He was a supporter and member of the right-wing Swiss People's Party.

Ospel died on 26 April 2020 aged 70 of cancer at his home in Wollerau.

Business positions
Preceded by Created	Group CEO of UBS AG; 1999–2001	Succeeded by Peter Wuffli
