= Rudolf Ernst (banker) =

Swiss banker (1865–1956)

- Born: 6 September 1865; Winterthur, Switzerland
- Died: 15 March 1956 (aged 90); Winterthur, Switzerland
- Occupation: Industrialist
- Known for: Founder of UBS, as the Union Bank of Switzerland

Dr. Rudolf Ernst (6 September 1865 – 15 March 1956) was a Swiss industrial, insurance and banking pioneer and lawyer who was a founding father of UBS Group AG. (formerly Union Bank of Switzerland.

He was the first CEO and chairman of the Board of Directors of the Union Bank of Switzerland, now UBS. Following his retirement, at age 77, he was elected Honorary Chairman of the Union Bank of Switzerland for life, but remained on the Board of Directors until 1953, when he retired at age 87.

== Biography ==
Rudolf Ernst was born in Winterhaur and joined the Bank in Winterthur in 1897, while he was active in several Swiss insurance and industrial companies, he also acted as the director of finances of the City of Winterthur from 1900 till 1916. In 1901, at the age of 35, he was elected as the chairman of the Board of Directors of the Bank in Winterthur

During his chairmanship, the bank changed its focus from its original lending business and began to expand its issuing and asset management franchise. With the acquisition of the Bank in Baden in 1906, the bank gained a branch at the Zurich Bahnhofstrasse and a seat on the stock exchange, one of the cornerstones for the successful merger in 1912 with the Toggenburger Bank to form Union Bank of Switzerland.

Ernst also held directorships on the boards of various industrial and insurance companies. Between 1912 and his retirement in 1941, he was chairman of the Board of Union Bank of Switzerland (now UBS), in an alternating capacity in 1916 and 1918, with Carl Emil Grob-Halter (d. 1921), and then held the chairmanship as the representative of the merged Toggenburger Bank.

== Personal life ==
Rudolf J.O. Ernst (now known as Rudy Ernst) is the grandson and only male descendant of Dr. Rudolf Ernst. He left Switzerland in 1982 with his wife Angelika and their two sons, Rudi and Patrick, to live in New York City.

== See also ==
- Sergio Ermotti
- Karen Schwok
