= Basler Bankierverein =

Consortium of banks in Switzerland

- Type: Public
- Industry: Banking
- Founded: 1854; 172 years ago
- Defunct: 1897

Basler Bankierverein (English: Bankers Association of Basel) was a consortium of private banks based in Basel, Switzerland. Founded in 1854, it acted as underwriting syndicate, to enable better financing of large industrial and railroad projects. It was one of the original predecessors of UBS.

== History ==
The Basler Bankverein was established in 1854 the following leading private banks; Bischoff zu St. Alban, Ehinger & Cie., Passavant & Cie., J. Riggenbach and von Speyr & Cie. In 1896, the Basler Bankverein merged with Zürcher Bankverein (a similar consortium of smaller private banks) and ultimately in 1897 into Swiss Banking Association. In 1998, they ultimately became UBS.
