= Schröder, Münchmeyer, Hengst & Co. =

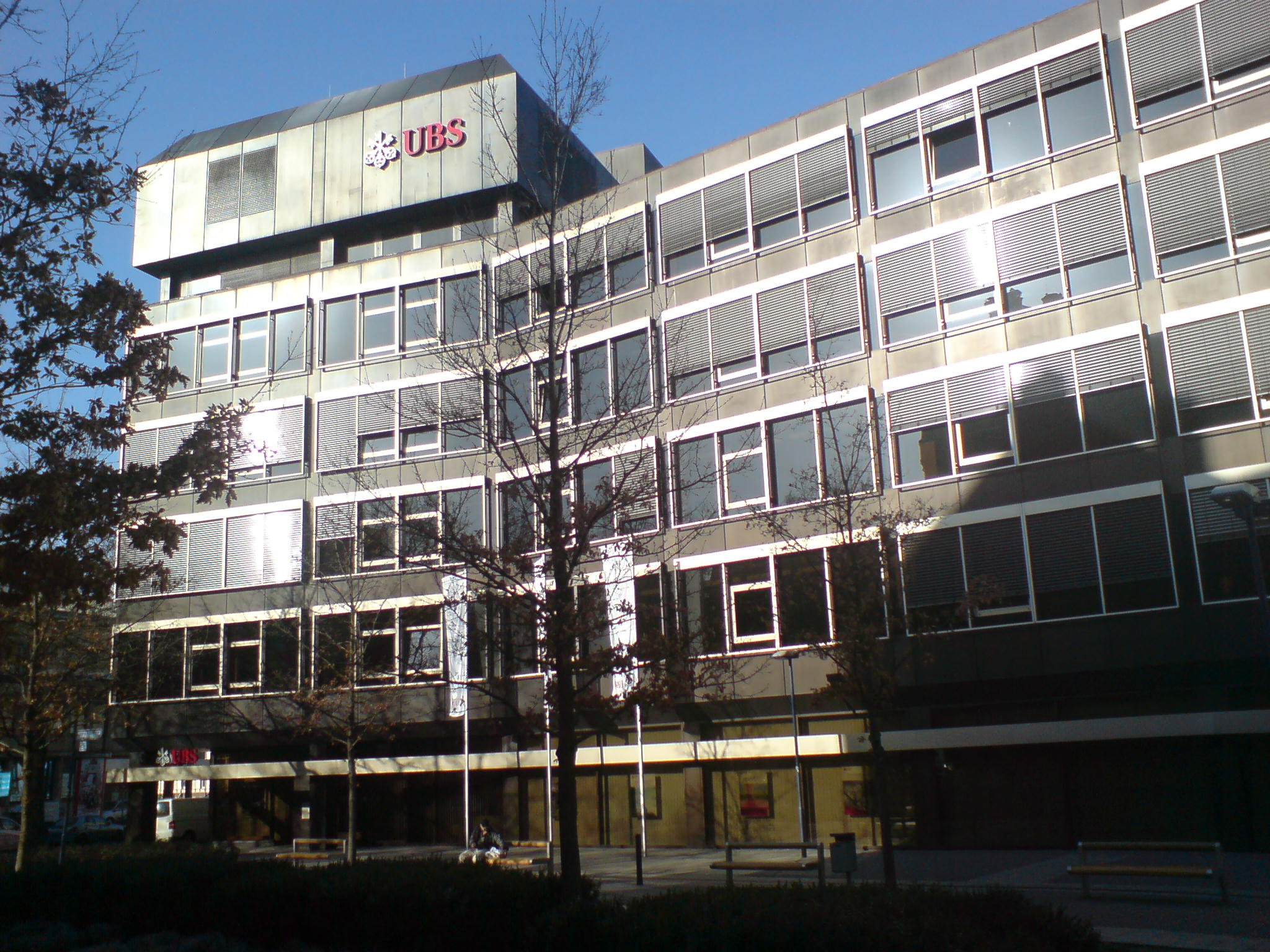
- SMH's former headquarters in Offenbach am Main, Germany after the takeover by UBS
- Company type: Private company
- Industry: Financial services
- Predecessor: Schröder Gebrüder & Co., Münchmeyer & Co. and Friedrich Hengst & Co.
- Founded: 1969
- Defunct: 1997
- Fate: Acquired
- Successor: UBS
- Headquarters: Hamburg, Germany
- Area served: Germany
- Products: Investment banking

Schröder, Münchmeyer, Hengst & Co. (also known as SMH) was a German investment bank and private bank based in Hamburg, Germany. The firm was acquired in 1997 by UBS and the brand was eliminated in 2001.

== History ==
Schröder, Münchmeyer, Hengst was formed through the 1969 merger of three German banks: Schröder Gebrüder & Co., Münchmeyer & Co. and Friedrich Hengst & Co. (formerly known as Bank Siegmund Merzbach).

SMH ran into serious difficulties in 1983 when it found itself overexposed to loans made to affiliated companies in Luxembourg. When one of the companies, a building machinery business, failed the entire firm failed. The Deutsche Bundesbank and the German regulators brought together the bank's management and creditors to resolve the situation. Under pressure from the German regulators, the creditors ultimately agreed to a number of extensions and forgave a portion of the debt while management sought to sell its assets. SMH sold its investment banking and other profitable businesses to Lloyds Bank.

In 1997, SMH was acquired from Lloyds by Union Bank of Switzerland in order to further penetrate the German investment banking market as well as the market for wealthy private clients.

Initially it was intended that SMH would retain its own identity. However, after the merger of Union Bank of Switzerland with Swiss Bank Corporation in 1998, the combined UBS began consolidating its diverse brands. In 2001, the bank dropped the use of the Schroeder, Muenchmeyer brand and the SMH stallion disappeared from the German banking landscape.

== See also ==
- List of banks in Germany
