= O'Connor & Associates =

American options trading firm

- Type: Subsidiary
- Industry: Financial services
- Founded: 1977; 49 years ago
- Founders: Michael Greenbaum, with the support of Edmund and William O'Connor
- Defunct: 2026
- Fate: Acquired
- Successor: Cantor Fitzgerald
- Headquarters: Chicago, United States
- Area served: United States
- Products: Options trading
- Owner: Cantor Fitzgerald

O'Connor & Associates ("O'Connor") was a Chicago-based options trading firm, with a particular emphasis on financial derivatives. Through a series of acquisitions, it later became a distinct alternative investment platform with hedge funds, private credit and commodities, operating under UBS and subsequently under Cantor Fitzgerald.

O'Connor was founded in 1977 by mathematician Michael Greenbaum, Edmund J. O'Connor and his brother William F. O'Connor. In 1992, the firm was acquired by Swiss Bank Corporation. The acquisition was part of Swiss Bank's efforts to expand its options trading capabilities in the United States. At the time of the acquisition, O'Connor had over 500 employees and was one of the largest options trading firms in the world.

After the acquisition, O'Connor continued to operate as a subsidiary of Swiss Bank Corporation. In 1998, Swiss Bank Corporation merged with Union Bank of Switzerland to form UBS. As part of the merger, O'Connor was then integrated into UBS's investment banking division as UBS O'Connor, evolving to become a multi-strategy hedge fund manager, managing $11 billion at its peak; it later became a part of UBS Asset Management.

In May 2025, UBS reached an agreement to sell O'Connor to Cantor Fitzgerald. The hedge fund platform now operates under Cantor Fitzgerald's asset management division as O'Connor Alternative Investments.

== History ==
=== Foundation and early years ===
O'Connor was founded in 1977 by mathematician Michael Greenbaum, with the support of Edmund and William O'Connor. The O'Connor brothers had made a fortune trading grain on the Chicago Board of Trade and founded First Options, a clearing house. The O'Connors provided Greenbaum, who had run risk management for First Options, with the capital to start his own firm.

SBC had established a strategic relationship with O'Connor, which was the largest market maker in the financial options exchanges in the U.S., beginning in 1988. O'Connor had been looking to partner with a larger financial institution. O'Connor entered into a currency joint venture with SBC, in 1989, that proved to be the first step towards a sale of O'Connor to SBC.

Following a 1992 merger, O'Connor was combined with SBC's money market, capital market, and currency market activities to form a globally integrated capital markets and treasury operation. A number of O'Connor executives were brought into key positions within Swiss Bank.

=== UBS O'Connor ===
As a result of the merger between the Union Bank of Switzerland and SBC in 1998, O'Connor became a distinct investment platform known as UBS O'Connor within UBS Investment Bank. The unit then evolved to become a multi-strategy hedge fund manager and subsequently became a distinct investment platform within UBS Asset Management with complete independence in regard to investment decision-making. The business' capabilities covered a range of investment strategies, which seek to achieve risk-adjusted absolute returns with low correlation to most major asset classes and traditional investment benchmarks.

Notable personnel who ran the O'Connor business included Blake Hiltabrand, Kevin Russel, Casey Talbot and Bernard Ahkong. O'Connor managed $11 billion in hedge fund strategies as of June 1, 2022.

=== O'Connor Alternative Investments ===
In May 2025, UBS announced the sale of O'Connor to Cantor Fitzgerald Asset Management, the deal was completed in 2026.
