= Basler Handelsbank =

Former Swiss bank

- Industry: Banking
- Founded: 1863
- Fate: Business taken over by the Swiss Bank Corporation (1945)
- Headquarters: Basel, Switzerland
- Parent: Harwanne (from 1991)

Basler Handelsbank (Commercial Bank of Basel; French: Banque commerciale de Bâle) was a Swiss bank in Basel. It began operating in 1863 and rose to become a big bank from the mid-1890s. After 1928 its concentration on Germany and the withdrawal of French flight capital proved its undoing, and in 1945 the Swiss Bank Corporation took over its business. The Basler Handelsbank was kept as a liquidation institution and in 1957 became a holding and finance company; it was sold to the Geneva company Harwanne in 1991 and delisted from the stock exchange in 1998.

== History ==
Founded by representatives of Basel's industrial and merchant capital and by private bankers, the Basler Handelsbank began operating in 1863 with a share capital of 20 million francs. Its total assets remained modest (21 million francs in 1895) until the mid-1890s, when its rise to a big bank began; its total assets reached 144 million francs in 1912 and 335 million in 1918, when its share capital stood at 60 million francs.

After its peak in 1928, with total assets of 666 million francs and a share capital of 100 million francs, the bank was undone by the concentration of its business in Germany (the transfer moratorium of 1931) and by the withdrawal of French flight capital (the Berthoud scandal of 1932); by 1935 its total assets had fallen to 286 million francs. A deferral of maturities (1935–1937) and capital reductions (1932, 1934 and 1937) helped only temporarily. When payments from Germany stopped, the Federal Banking Commission had to grant the bank a payment deferral on 1 August 1945.

The Swiss Bank Corporation took over its business and kept the Basler Handelsbank as a liquidation institution for the blocked assets, which gained greatly in value during the German economic miracle. Converted into a holding and finance company in 1957, the Basler Handelsbank ran into difficulties in 1989 because of bad investments in Germany and needed massive cash injections from the Swiss Bank Corporation. In 1991 the Swiss Bank Corporation sold it to the Geneva holding company Harwanne, which had it delisted from the stock exchange in 1998.

== Bibliography ==
- H. Bauer, 125 Jahre Basler Handelsbank (1863–1988), [1988]
