= Swiss Bank Corporation =

Swiss investment bank and financial services firm

- Industry: Banking; Financial services Investment services
- Predecessor: Bankverein (1854–1872); Basler Bankverein (1872–1895); Basler & Zürcher Bankverein (1895)
- Founded: 1854; 172 years ago
- Defunct: 1998
- Fate: Merged with Union Bank of Switzerland to form UBS
- Successor: UBS
- Headquarters: Basel, Switzerland

Swiss Bank Corporation (French: Société de banque suisse; German: Schweizerischer Bankverein) was a Swiss investment bank and financial services company located in Switzerland. Prior to its merger, the bank was the third largest in Switzerland, with over CHF 300 billion of assets and CHF 11.7 billion of equity.

Throughout the 1990s, SBC engaged in a large growth initiative, shifting its focus from traditional commercial banking into investment banking, in an effort to match its larger Swiss rival Credit Suisse. As part of this strategy, SBC acquired US-based investment bank Dillon Read & Co. as well as London-based merchant bank S.G. Warburg in the mid-1990s. SBC also acquired Chicago-based Brinson Partners and O'Connor & Associates. These acquisitions formed the basis for a global investment banking business.

In 1998, SBC merged with Union Bank of Switzerland to form UBS, then the largest bank in Europe and the second largest bank in the world. The company's logo, which featured three keys, symbolizing "confidence, security, and discretion", was adopted by UBS after the 1998 merger. Although the combination of the two banks was billed as a merger of equals, it quickly became evident that from a management perspective, it was SBC that was buying UBS. Nearly 80% of the top management positions were filled by legacy Swiss Bank professionals. Today, what was SBC forms the core of many of UBS's businesses, particularly UBS Investment Bank.

== History ==
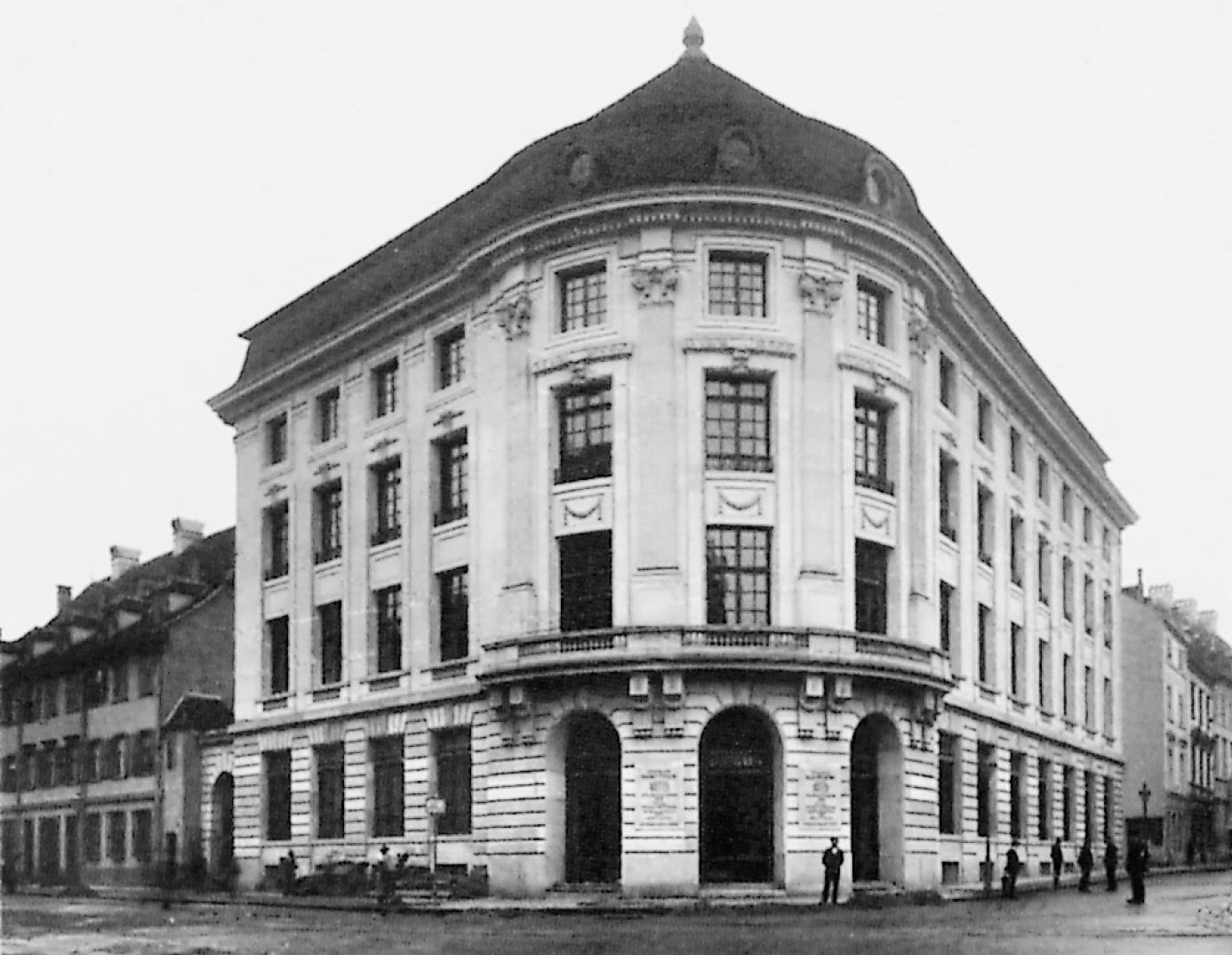
The Basel, Switzerland, offices of Swiss Bank Corporation c.1920

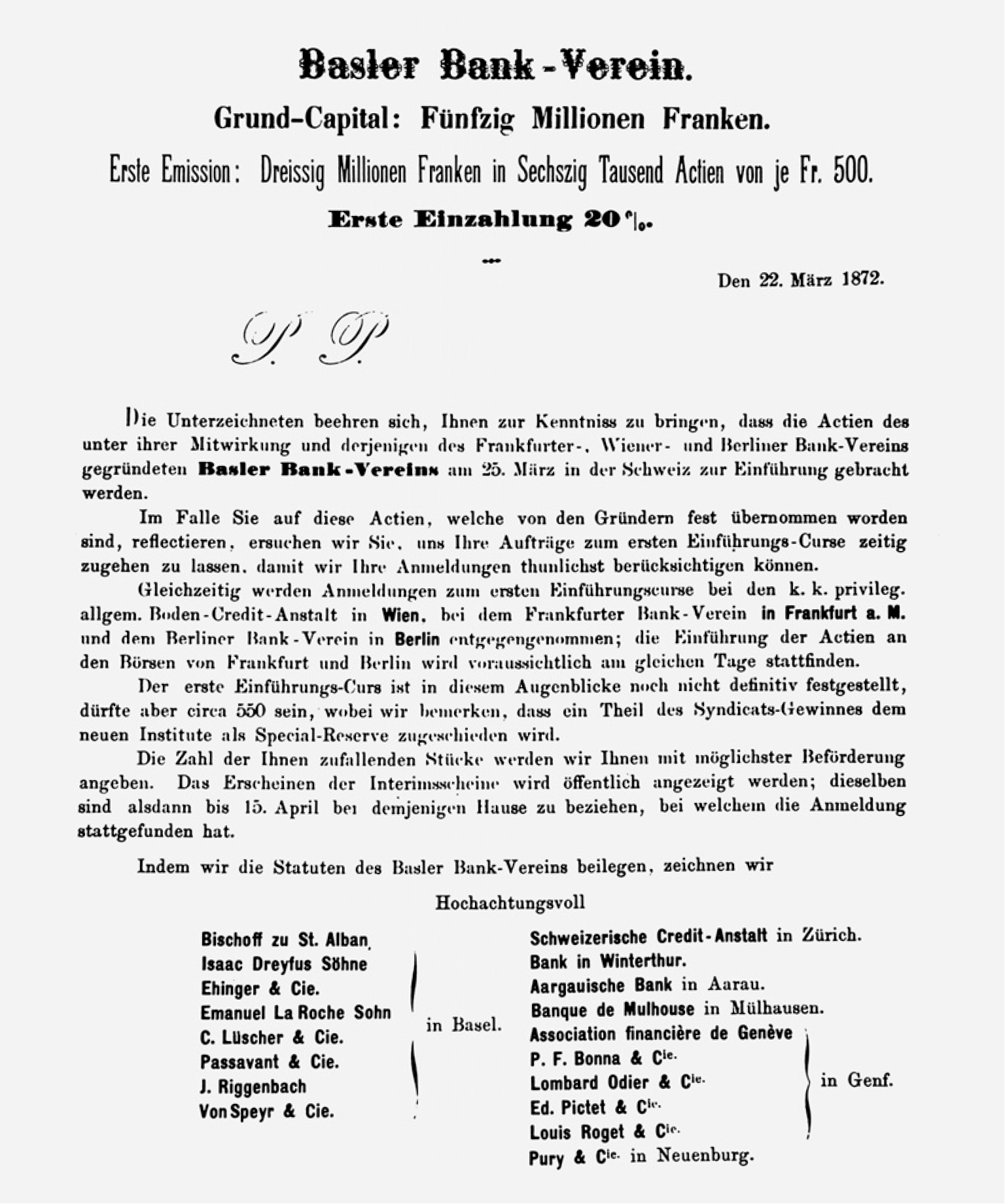
1872 Basler Bankverein investor prospectus

Swiss Bank Corporation traces its history to 1854. In that year, six private banking firms in Basel, Switzerland, pooled their resources to form the Bankverein, a consortium that acted as an underwriting syndicate for its member banks. Among the original member banks were Bischoff zu St Alban, Ehinger & Cie., J. Merian-Forcart, Passavant & Cie., J. Riggenbach and von Speyr & Cie. The establishment of joint-stock banks in Switzerland such as Swiss Bank's earliest predecessors (often structured as a Swiss Verein) was driven by the industrialization of the country and the construction of railroads in the mid-19th century.

The Basler Bankverein was formally organized in 1872 in Basel, replacing the original Bankverein consortium. Basler Bankverein was founded with an initial commitment of CHF 30 million, of which CHF 6 million of initial share capital was paid in. Among the Bankverein's early backers was the Bank in Winterthur, one of the early predecessors of the Union Bank of Switzerland. The bank experienced initial growing pains after heavy losses in Germany caused the bank to suspend its dividend in favor of a loss reserve. By 1879, Basler Bankverein has accumulated enough capital to resume dividends, initially at an 8% annual rate and then increasing to 10% in 1880.

Basler Bankverein later combined with Zürcher Bankverein in 1895 to become the Basler & Zürcher Bankverein. In 1896, the corporation merged with Basler Depositenbank and the Schweizerische Unionbank of St. Gallen, an institution co-founded by financier Georg Karl Rietmann-Gruebler, who served as its vice-president. After the take-over of the Basler Depositenbank, the bank changes its name to Schweizerischer Bankverein (Swiss Bank). The English name of the bank was changed to Swiss Bank Corporation in 1917.

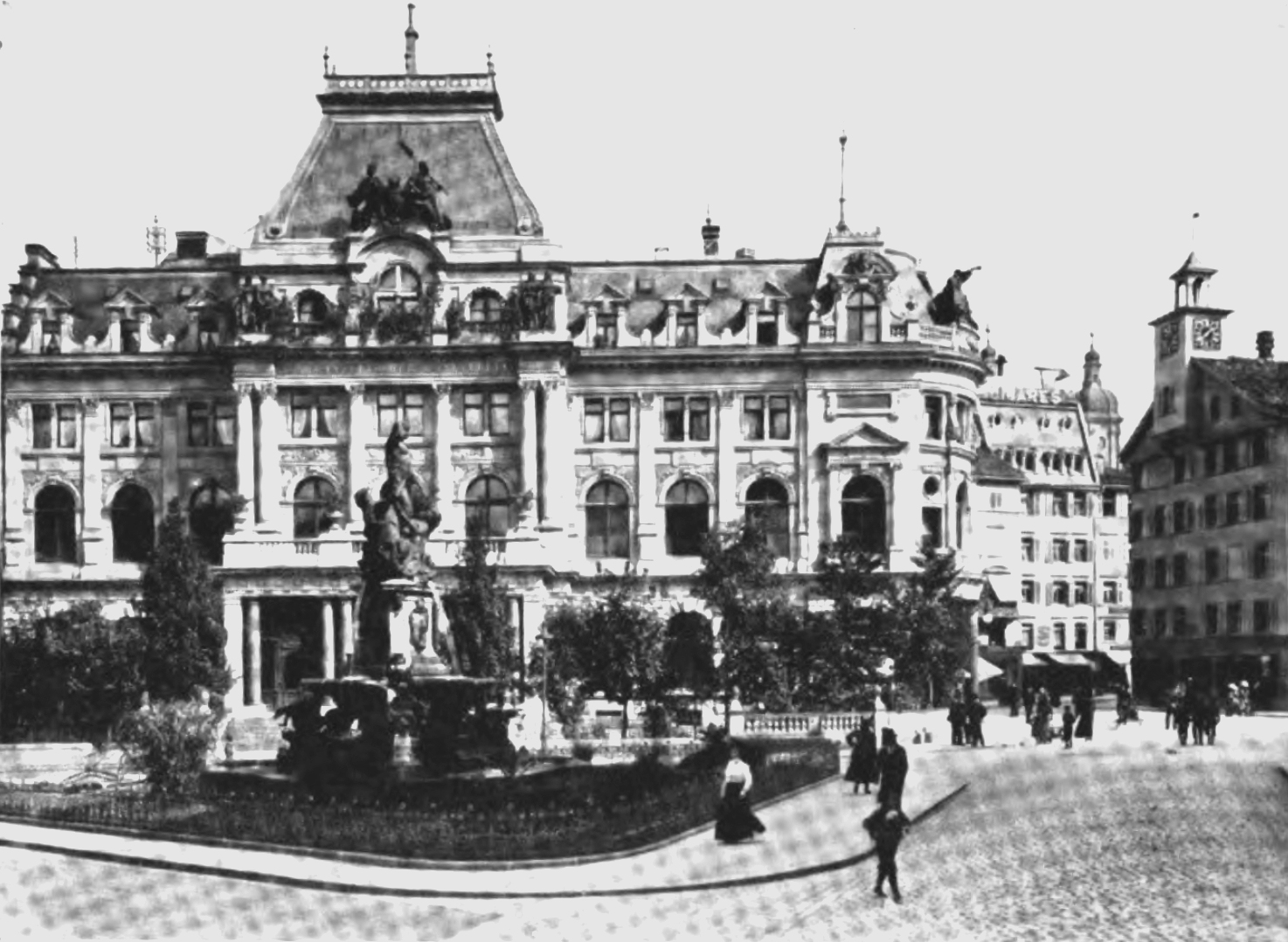
The St. Gallen, Switzerland, offices in Swiss Bank Corporation c.1920

=== 1900–1939 ===
SBC continued to grow in the early decades of the 20th century, acquiring weaker rivals. In 1906, SBC purchased Banque d'Espine, Fatio & Cie, establishing a branch in Geneva, Switzerland, for the first time. Two years later, in 1908, the bank acquired Fratelli Pasquali, a bank in Chiasso, Switzerland, its first representation in the Italian-speaking portion of the country. This was followed by the 1909 acquisition of Bank für Appenzell (est. 1866) and the 1912 acquisition of Banque d'Escompte et de Dépots.

The onset of World War I put a hold on much of the bank's development. Although SBC survived the war intact, it suffered the loss of its investments in a number of large industrial companies. Nevertheless, the bank surpassed CHF 1 billion for the first time at the end of 1918 and grew to 2,000 employees by 1920. In 1918, SBC purchased Métaux Précieux SA Métalor to refine precious metals and produce bank ingots. the company would be established as a separate subsidiary in 1936 and spun off in 1998. The impact of the stock market crash of 1929 and the Great Depression would be severe, particularly as the Swiss franc suffered major devaluation in 1936. The bank would see its assets fall from a 1929 peak of CHF 1.6 billion to its 1918 levels of CHF 1 billion by 1936.

In 1937, SBC adopted its three keys logo symbolizing confidence, security and discretion. The logo was designed by a Swiss artist and illustrator, Warja Honegger-Lavater.

=== Activities in World War II ===
On the eve of World War II, SBC was the recipient of large influxes of foreign funds for safekeeping. Just prior to the outbreak of World War II, in 1939, Swiss Bank Corporation made the timely decision to open an office in New York City. The office was able to begin operations, located in the Equitable Building, just weeks after the outbreak of the war and was intended as a safe place to store assets in case of an invasion. During the war, the bank's traditional business fell off and the Swiss government became its largest client. Overall, SBC saw its business grow as a result of its wartime government underwriting business.

Decades after the war, it was demonstrated that Swiss Bank Corporation likely took an active role in trading stolen gold, securities and other assets during World War II.

In 1997, the World Jewish Congress lawsuit against Swiss banks (WJC) was launched to retrieve deposits made by victims of Nazi persecution during and prior to World War II. Negotiations involving SBC's successor UBS, Credit Suisse, the World Jewish Congress and Stuart Eizenstat, on behalf of the US, ultimately resulted in a settlement of US$1.25 billion in August 1998 paid by the two large Swiss banks UBS and Credit Suisse. The settlement, which coincided with UBS's merger with Swiss Bank, together with the bank's embarrassment in the Long Term Capital Management collapse in 1998 brought a degree of closure to the issue.

=== 1945–1990 ===
Swiss Bank Corporation found itself in relatively strong financial condition at the end of World War II, with CHF 1.8 billion of assets. By contrast, the Basler Handelsbank (Commercial Bank of Basel), founded in 1862 and one of the largest banks in Switzerland, was insolvent at the end of the war and was consequently acquired by SBC in 1945. SBC remained among the Swiss government's leading underwriters of debt in the post-war years. However, by 1947 SBC was shifting its focus back to its traditional business of lending money principally to private companies as part of the postwar rebuilding of Europe. Meanwhile, the firm continued its expansion to international markets, particularly the United States where SBC focused primarily on commercial banking for corporate clients. Within Switzerland, SBC remained a full-service bank with a domestic retail banking network and an asset management business.

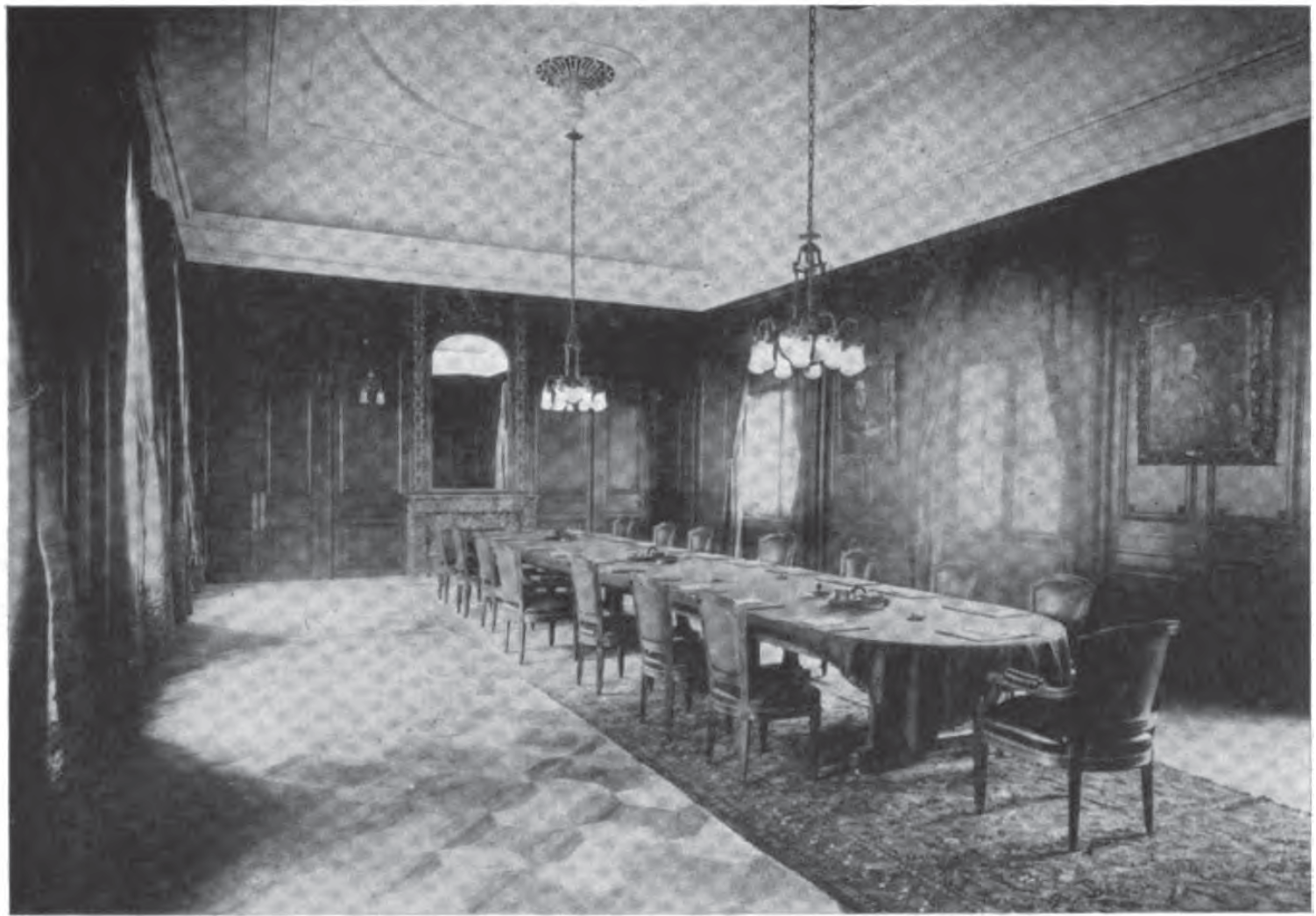
The Swiss Bank Corporation board room in Basel, Switzerland

SBC prospered throughout the 1950s and embarked on a period of sustained growth. The bank, which had entered the 1950s with 31 Branch Offices in Switzerland and three abroad, more than doubled its assets from the end of the war to CHF 4 billion by the end of the 1950s and doubled assets again by the mid-1960s, exceeding CHF 10 billion in 1965. SBC acquired Banque Populaire Valaisanne, Sion, Switzerland, and the Banque Populaire de Sierre. The firm continued to open new offices in the US in the mid-1960s and it was also at this time that SBC began to expand into Asia and opened representative offices throughout Latin America. The bank opened a full branch office in Tokyo in 1970. The bank also made a number of acquisitions to enhance its position in various products. SBC acquired a controlling interest in Frei, Treig & Cie. in 1968, Warag Bank in 1970 and Bank Prokredit in 1979 (later sold to GE Capital in 1997). All three banks focused on consumer lending. Similarly, SBC acquired a number of banks in the private banking sector, including Ehinger & Cie. in 1974; Armand von Ernst & Cie. and Adler & Co. in 1976; and a majority interest in Geneva-based Ferrier Lullin & Cie. in 1978. The bank continued its consolidation of Swiss banks acquiring Banque Commerciale de Sion in 1978 and in 1979 acquired Handwerkerbank Basle, the Banca Prealpina SA and Bank für Hypothekarkredite.

As its own home market was highly competitive, SBC focused on commercial banking for American and other multinational companies. Through 1979, SBC was consistently the largest of the three major Swiss Bank by assets, except for short periods in 1962 and 1968 when UBS temporarily moved ahead of SBC. After 1979, although its balance sheet had grown to CHF 74 billion of assets, the bank would typically rank second to UBS which firmly established itself as the largest Swiss bank in the 1980s. SBC would retain this position for the next 15 years until Credit Suisse leapfrogged into the top spot following its 1995 acquisitions of Schweizerische Volksbank and Winterthur Group.

=== Aggressive acquisitions (1990–1998) ===
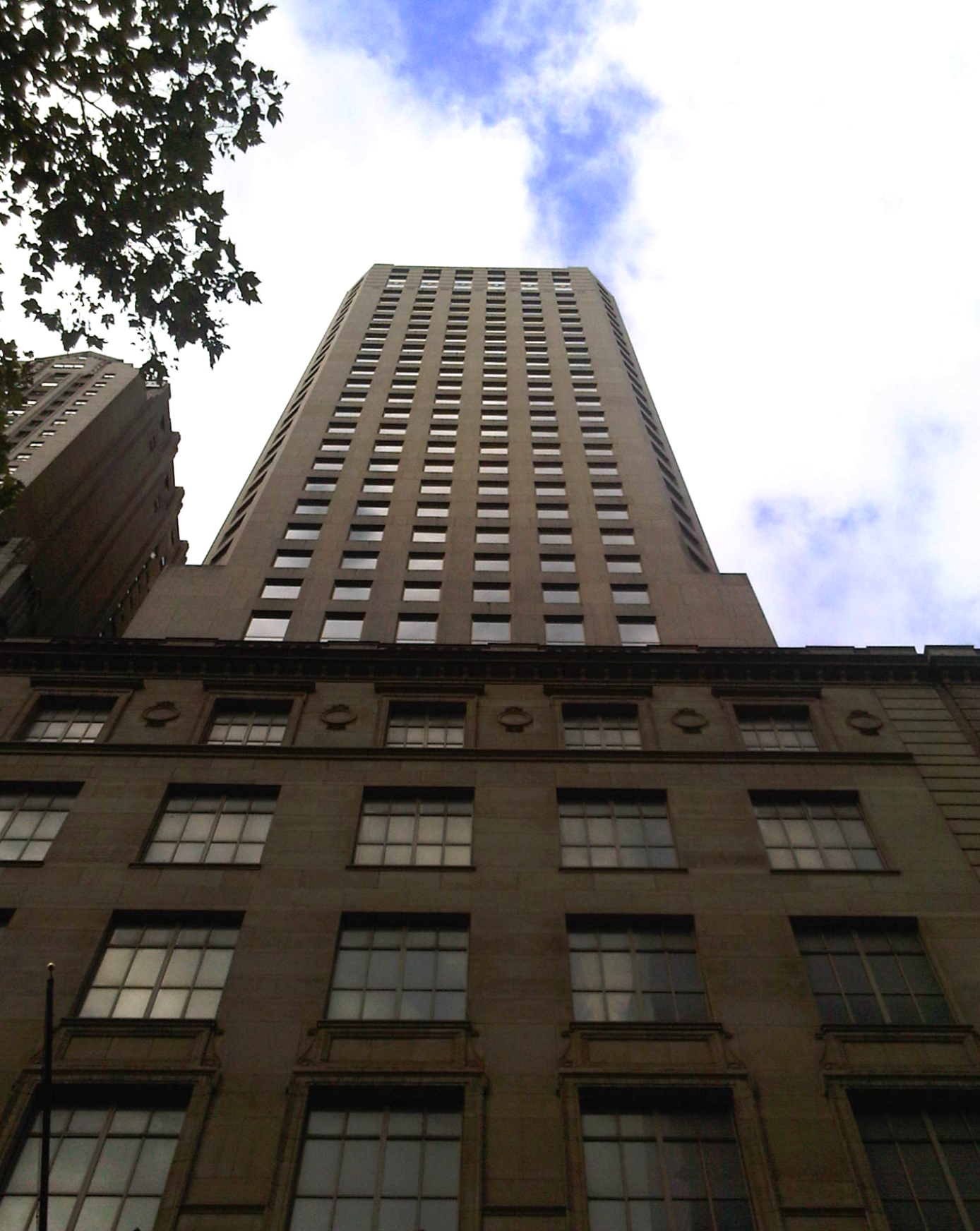
The former Swiss Bank Tower off of Fifth Avenue in New York City opened in 1990.

Swiss Bank began the 1990s as the weakest of the "Big Three" Swiss banks but by the end of 1997 would be the driving force behind the merger with Union Bank of Switzerland. SBC had been impacted by losses on its real estate investments and a series of minor controversies, despite the bank's historically conservative posture. Beginning in the 1980s, SBC along with its Swiss peers began to embrace a more aggressive strategy to keep up with competitors in the US, Japan, Germany and the UK. The bank signaled its new posture in 1990 when it opened its new US headquarters, Swiss Bank Tower, a 29 floor building on 49th Street, adjoining Saks Fifth Avenue.

SBC shifted its focus from traditional commercial banking toward investment banking with an emphasis on building its trading operations. To bolster its trading initiative, in 1992, SBC acquired O'Connor & Associates, a Chicago-based options trading firm, with an expertise in financial derivatives. O'Connor was founded in 1977 by mathematician Michael Greenbaum and was named for Edmund (Ed) and Williams (Bill) O'Connor. The O'Connor brothers had made a fortune trading grain on the Chicago Board of Trade and founded a First Options, a clearing house business. The O'Connors provided Greenbaum, who had run risk management for First Options, with the capital to start his own firm. SBC had established a strategic relationship with O'Connor, which was the largest market maker in the financial options exchanges in the US, beginning in 1988. O'Connor had been looking to partner with a larger financial institution and in 1989 entered into a currency joint venture with SBC that proved to be the first step towards a sale of O'Connor to SBC. Following the merger, O'Connor was combined with SBC's money market, capital market and currency market activities to form a globally integrated capital markets and treasury operation. A number of O'Connor executives were brought into key positions within the bank in an attempt to cultivate a more entrepreneurial culture at SBC.

SBC acquired Gary P. Brinson's Brinson Partners in 1994 to bolster the bank's US asset management business.

In 1994, SBC followed up its acquisition of O'Connor by acquiring Brinson Partners an asset management firm focused on providing access for US institutions to global markets. Founded by Gary P. Brinson, an innovator in financial management, Brinson Partners had emerged as one of largest managers of pension plans and also managed a series of mutual funds. Brinson was a pioneer in the development of the theory of asset allocation which had largely become conventional wisdom among money managers in the 1980s and 1990s. Brinson had begun working at First Chicago Corporation in the 1970s and by 1981 began building the business that would become Brinson Partners. In 1989, Brinson led a US$100 million management buyout of his firm from First Chicago Corporation and over the next five years built up the firm to approximately US$36 billion of assets under management. SBC paid US$750 million to acquire Brinson Partners, which resulted in a profit to Brinson and his partners of US$460 million on the sale of their 75% stake in the company. Following the acquisition of Brinson Partners, Gary Brinson ran SBC's asset management business and after the merger with UBS, Brinson was named chief investment officer of UBS Global Asset Management.

SBC spent US$2 billion to assemble an investment banking franchise through the acquisitions of S.G. Warburg in 1995 and Dillon, Read & Co. in 1997 to form Warburg Dillon Read.

SBC's next made a major push into investment banking with the acquisition of S.G. Warburg & Co. a leading British investment banking firm in 1995 for US$1.4 billion. S.G. Warburg was founded by Siegmund Warburg, a member of the Warburg banking family. After World War II, S.G. Warburg established a reputation as a daring merchant bank that grew to be one of the most respected investment banks in London. Following a flawed and costly expansion into the US, in 1994 a merger was announced with Morgan Stanley, but the talks collapsed. The following year S.G. Warburg was purchased by Swiss Bank Corporation. The bank merged S.G. Warburg with its own existing investment banking unit to create SBC Warburg, which became a leading player in global investment banking.

Two years later, in 1997, SBC paid US$600 million to acquire Dillon, Read & Co., a white shoe US investment banking firm considered to be a member of the bulge bracket. Dillon, Read, which traced its roots to the 1830s was among the powerhouse firms on Wall Street in the 1920s and 1930s and by the 1990s had a particularly strong mergers and acquisitions advisory group. Dillon Read had been in negotiations to sell itself to ING which owned 25% of the firm already, however Dillon Read partners balked at ING's integration plans. After its acquisition by SBC, Dillon Read was merged with SBC-Warburg to create SBC-Warburg Dillon Read. The Dillon Read name was discontinued after the merger with Union Bank of Switzerland although it was brought back in 2005 as Dillon Read Capital Management, UBS's ill-fated hedge fund operations.

=== Merger with Union Bank of Switzerland ===
Aggressively pushing ahead its various acquisitions, UBS was mired in a series of entanglements with activist shareholders who were critical of bank's relatively conservative management. Martin Ebner, through his investment trust, BK Vision became the largest shareholder in UBS and attempted to force a major restructuring of the bank’s operations. The groundwork for the merger of SBC and UBS was actually laid by their mutual competitor, Credit Suisse which had approached UBS about a merger that would have created the second largest bank in the world in 1996. UBS's management and board unanimously rebuffed the proposed merger. Ebner, who supported the idea of a merger, led a major shareholder revolt that resulted in the replacement of UBS's chairman, Robert Studer. Studer's successor Mathis Cabiallavetta would be one of the key architects of the merger with SBC.

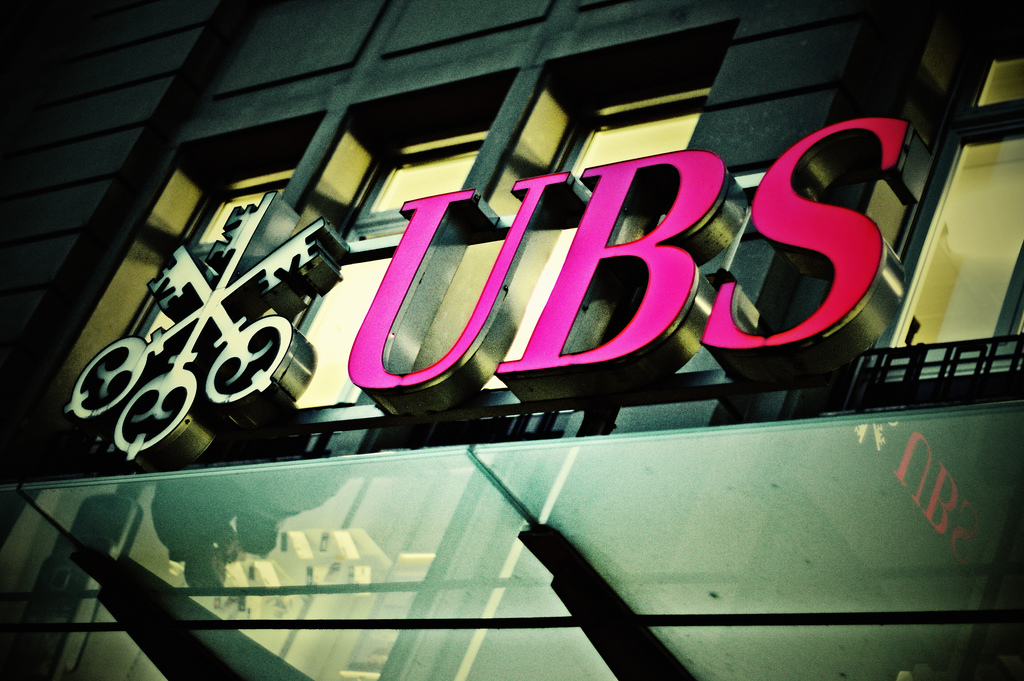
The combined UBS logo incorporated UBS's name with SBC's "three keys" symbol.

On December 8, 1997, Union Bank of Switzerland and SBC announced an all-stock merger. At the time of the merger, Union Bank of Switzerland and Swiss Bank Corporation were the second and third largest banks in Switzerland, respectively, both trailing Credit Suisse. Discussions between the two banks had begun several months earlier, less than a year after rebuffing Credit Suisse's merger overtures.

The all-stock merger resulted in the creation UBS AG, a huge new bank with total assets of more than US$590 billion. Also referred to as the "New UBS" to distinguish itself from the former Union Bank of Switzerland, the combined bank became the second largest in the world, at that time, behind only the Bank of Tokyo-Mitsubishi. Additionally, the merger pulled together the banks' various asset businesses to create the world's largest money manager, with approximately US$910 billion in assets under management.

The merger, which was billed as a merger of equals, resulted in SBC's shareholders receiving 40% of the bank's common shares and Union Bank's shareholders receiving 60% of the combined company. SBC's Marcel Ospel was named chief executive officer while Union Bank's Mathis Cabiallavetta became chairman of the new bank. However, it quickly became evident that from a management perspective, it was SBC that was buying UBS as nearly 80% of the top management positions were filled by legacy Swiss Bank professionals. Additionally, UBS professionals suffered more headcount reductions, particularly in the investment banking unit where there were heavy cuts in the corporate finance and equities businesses. Prior to the merger, Swiss Bank Corporation had built a global investment banking business, Warburg Dillon Read through its acquisitions of Dillon Read in New York and S.G. Warburg in London. SBC was generally considered to be further along than UBS in developing its international investment banking business, particularly in the higher margin advisory businesses where Warburg Dillon Read was considered to be the more established platform.

After the merger was completed, it was widely speculated that a series of losses suffered by UBS on its equity derivative positions in late 1997 provided SBC with the leverage it required to consummate the merger. It would become clear that the derivatives losses prompted UBS to accept the terms proposed by SBC more readily than they otherwise would have.

=== After the merger ===
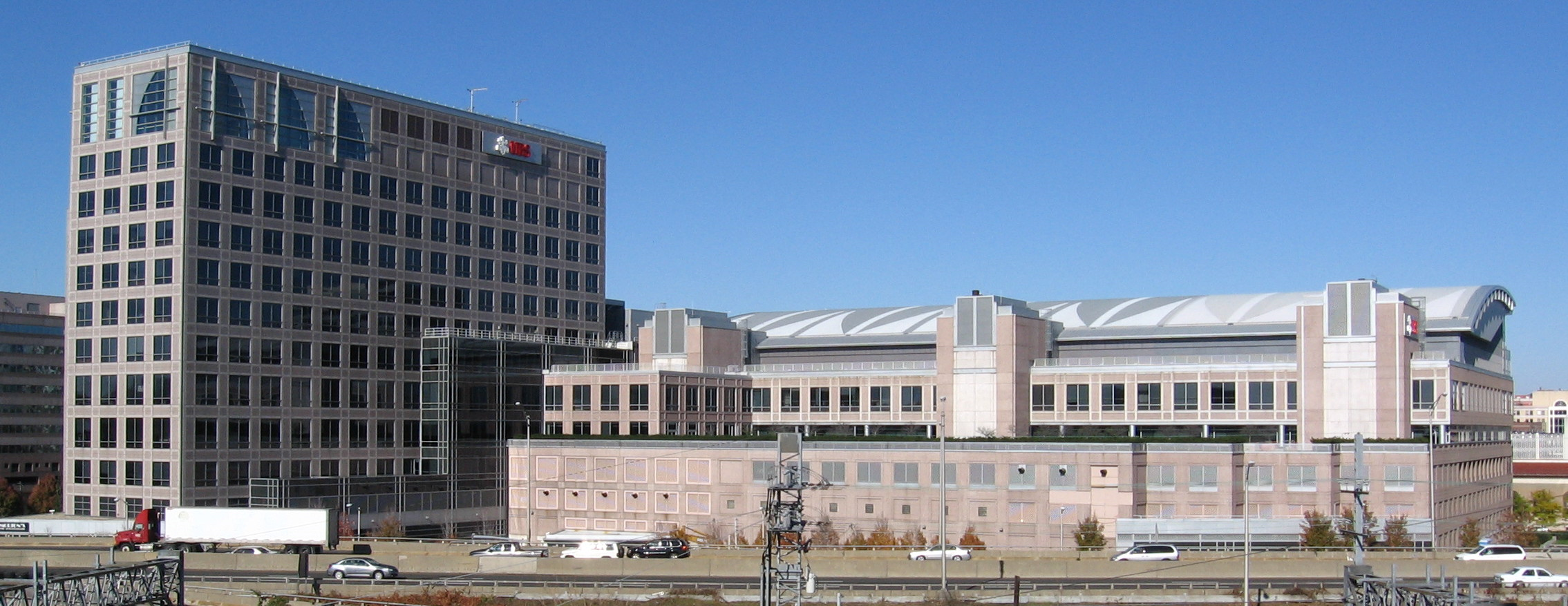
SBC had announced in 1994 that the bank would move its US headquarters to Stamford, Connecticut, in exchange for US$120 million in tax credits. Later the headquarters of UBS Investment Bank's trading operations, the Stamford complex featured the largest trading floor ever built, roughly the size of two football fields. Following an expansion in 2002, the floor covers 103,000-square-foot (9,600 m^{2}) with 40-foot (12 m) arched ceilings.

UBS, the successor of the Union Bank of Switzerland, is among the largest diversified financial institutions in the world. As of 2010, UBS operated in all of the major financial centers worldwide with offices in over 50 countries and 64,000 employees globally.

In November 2000, UBS merged with Paine Webber an American stock brokerage and asset management firm led by chairman and CEO, Donald Marron. The acquisition pushed UBS to the top Wealth and Asset Management Firm in the world. Initially the business was given the divisional name "UBS PaineWebber" but in 2003 the 123-year-old name Paine Webber disappeared when it was renamed "UBS Wealth Management USA."

The bank would grow considerably in the 2000s, building a large investment banking franchise to compete with the major US and European bulge bracket firms. However, UBS suffered major setbacks in 2007, 2008 and 2009. UBS suffered among the largest losses of any European bank during the subprime mortgage crisis and the bank was required to raise large amounts of outside capital from the Government of Singapore Investment Corporation, the Swiss government and through a series of equity offerings in 2008 and 2009.

=== Acquisition history ===
Swiss Bank Corporation, prior to its merger with Union Bank of Switzerland was the result of the combination of dozens of individual firms, many of which date to the 19th century. The following is an illustration of the company's major mergers and acquisitions and historical predecessors, although this is not necessarily a comprehensive list:

- Swiss Bank Corporation (merged 1977)
  - Swiss Bank Corporation (merged 1897)
    - Basler & Zürcher Bankverein (est. 1880)
      - Basler Bankverein
        (est. 1856 as Bankverein,
        renamed in 1872)
      - Zürcher Bankverein
        (est. 1889)
    - Basler Depositenbank
      (est. 1882)
    - Schweiz Unionbank
      (est. 1889)
  - Basler Handelsbank
    (est. 1862, acq. 1945)
  - O'Connor
    (est. 1977, acq. 1992)
  - Brinson Partners
    (est. 1989 originally division of First Chicago Corporation started c. 1981, acq. 1994)
  - Warburg Dillon Read (merged 1997 with SBC-Warburg under SBC ownership)
    - S. G. Warburg & Co.
      (est. 1946, acq. 1995
      to form SBC-Warburg)
    - Dillon, Read & Co.
      (est. 1832, acq. 1997)

== See also ==
- UBS, successor following merger with Union Bank of Switzerland
- Banking in Switzerland
