= Toggenburger Bank =

Swiss bank (1863–1912)

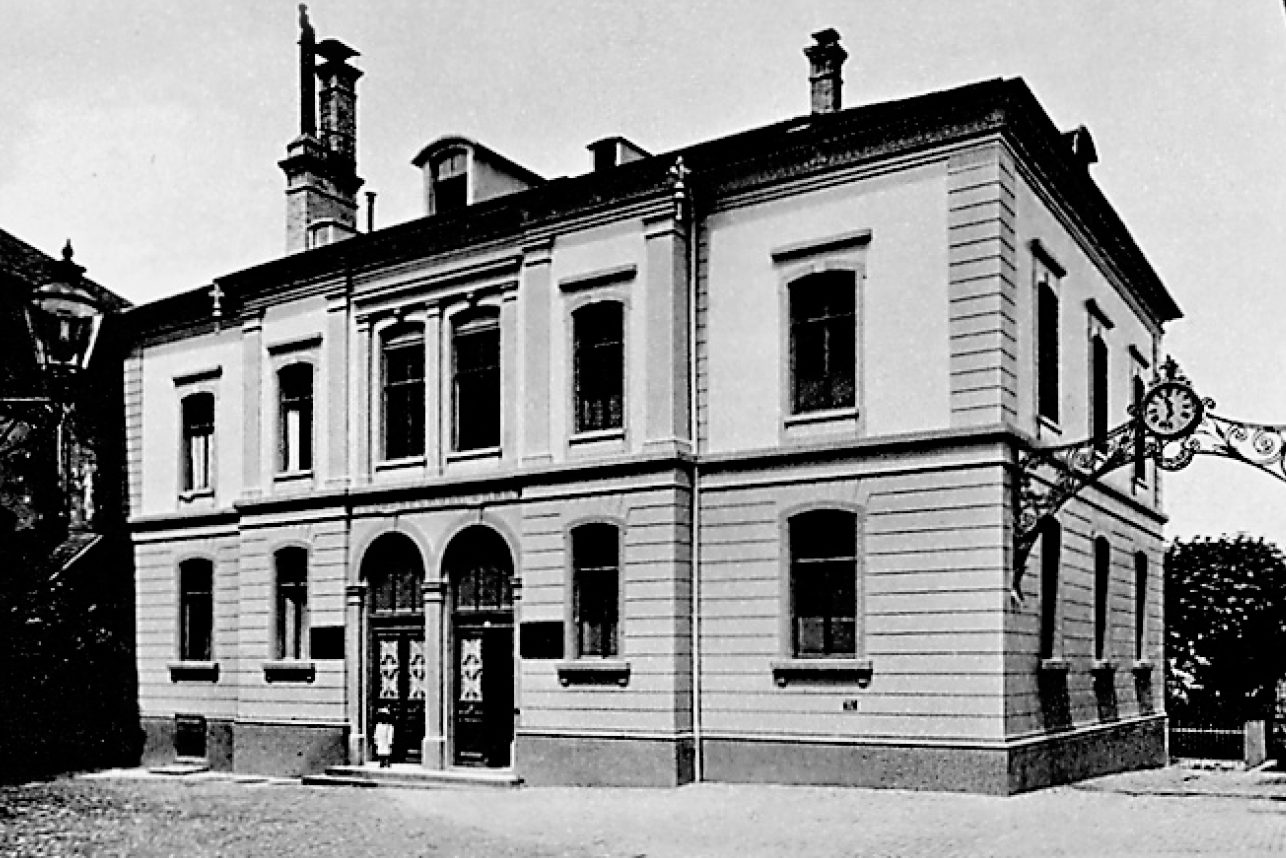
The Toggenburger Bank, est. 1863 in Lichtensteig, Switzerland

Toggenburger Bank is one of the original predecessor banks to the Union Bank of Switzerland and ultimately UBS. Established in 1863, the bank merged with the Bank in Winterthur in 1912 to form the Union Bank of Switzerland.

== History ==
In 1863, the Toggenburger Bank was founded in Lichtensteig, Switzerland (canton of St. Gallen), with an initial share capital of 1.5 million CHF.

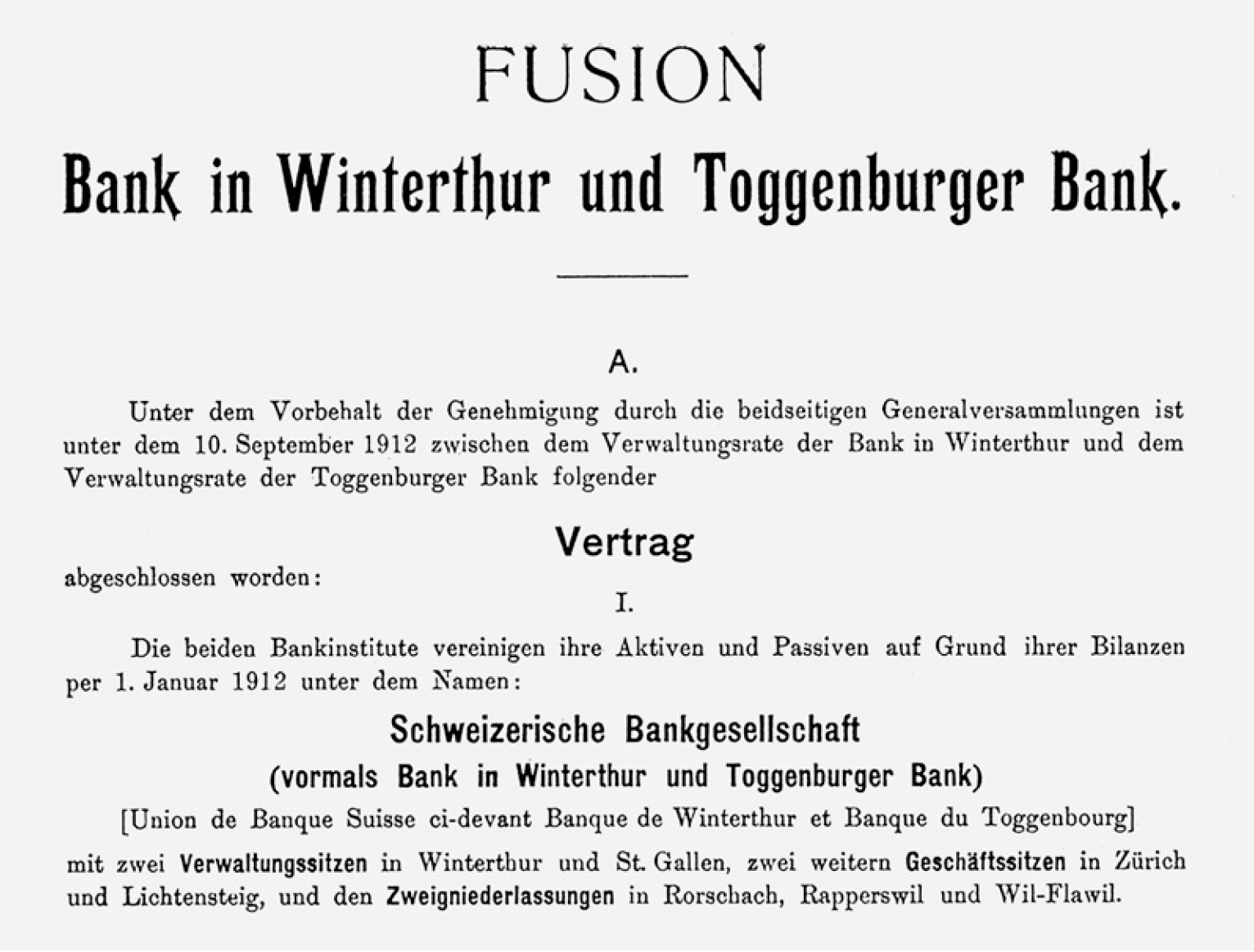
Announcement of the 1912 merger between Bank in Winterthur and Toggenburger Bank to form Schweizerische Bankgesellschaft (Union Bank of Switzerland)

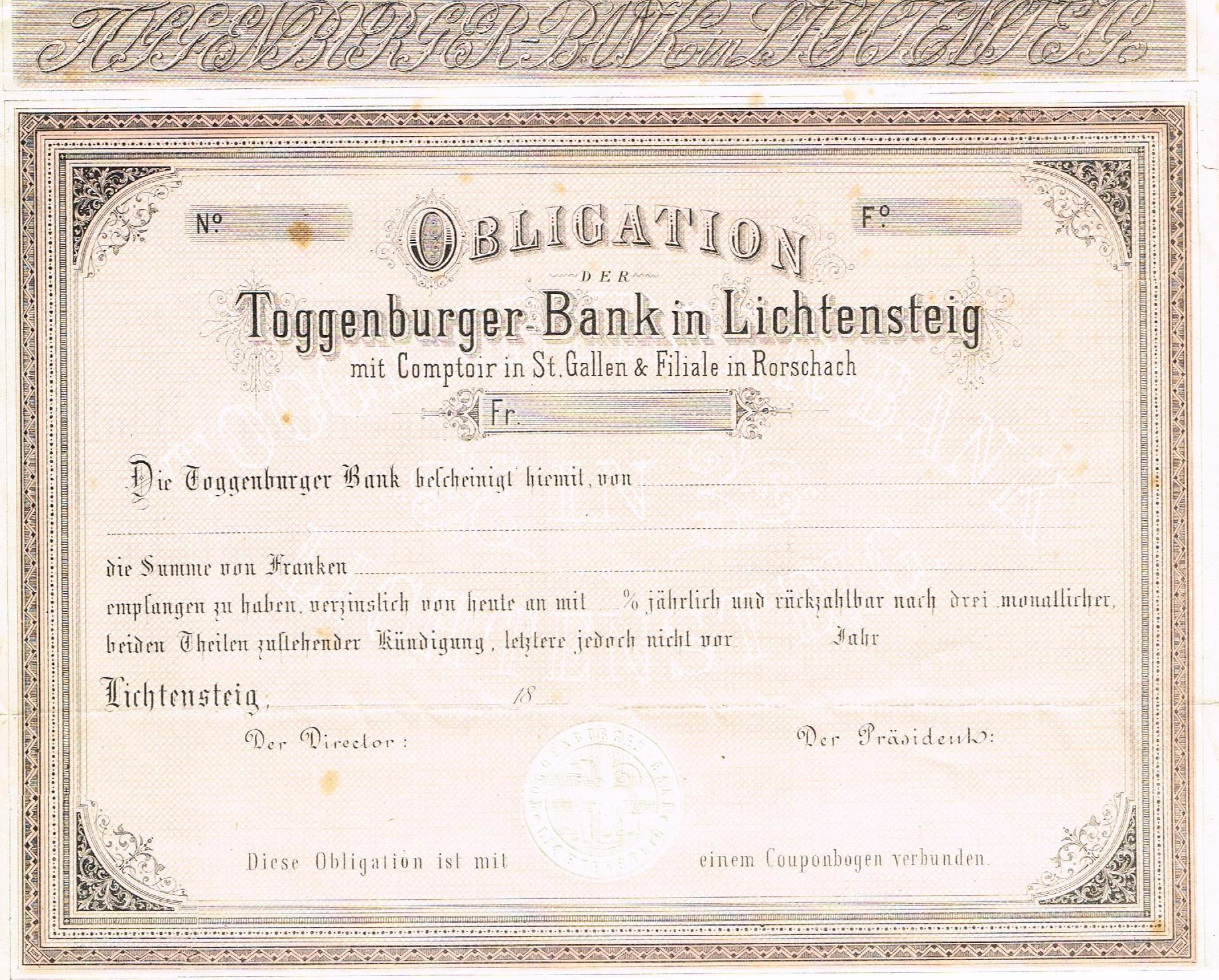
Unissued Bond of the Toggenburger Bank

The Toggenburger Bank was a savings and mortgage bank for individual customers with a branch office network in Eastern Switzerland. In 1882, Toggenburger Bank opened a branch in St. Gallen in eastern Switzerland and began to shift its operations there through the end of the 19th century.

The Union Bank of Switzerland was formed in 1912 when the Bank in Winterthur merged with the Toggenburger Bank. The combined bank had total assets of 202 million CHF and a total shareholders' equity of 46 million CHF. This combination was part of a larger trend toward concentration in the banking sector in Switzerland at the time. Through the next few years, the bank would begin to shift its operations to Zurich from its historical headquarters in the cities of Winterthur and St. Gallen, Switzerland. In 1917, UBS completed construction of a new headquarters in Zurich on Bahnhofstrasse, considered to be the Wall Street of Switzerland.

The new bank used different names in its three core languages: German, French and English. In German, the bank was Schweizerische Bankgesellschaft and was known by the initials SBG. The original English name for the combined bank was the Swiss Banking Association, but it was later changed to Union Bank of Switzerland in 1921 to mirror the French form of the name: Union de Banques Suisses. The bank's logo, introduced in 1966, would later reflect both the German SBG and the English and French name UBS.

== Bibliography ==
- Walder-Heene, Emil (1914). Die Toggenburger Bank 1863-1912. Zollikofer.
