= Bank in Winterthur =

Former Swiss bank (1862–1912)

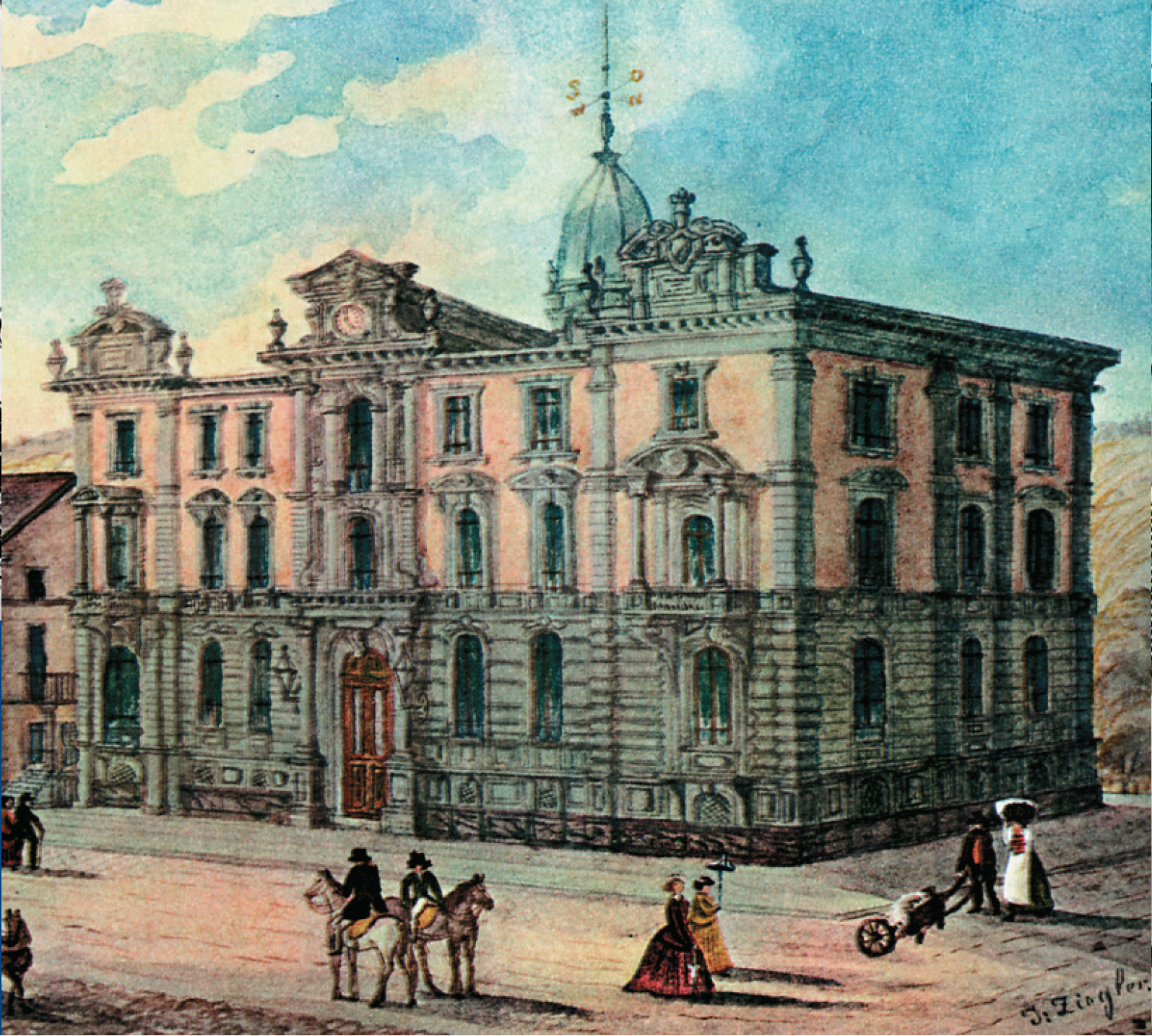
- Bank in Winterthur's headquarters in Winterthur, Switzerland, c. 1862
- Company type: Public
- Industry: Financial services
- Founded: 1862; 163 years ago
- Founders: Johann Jakob Scherer; Salomon Volkart
- Defunct: 1912
- Fate: Merged with Toggenburger Bank to form Union Bank of Switzerland
- Headquarters: Winterthur, Switzerland

The Bank in Winterthur is one of the original predecessor banks to the Union Bank of Switzerland and ultimately UBS. Established in 1862, the bank merged with Toggenburger Bank in 1912 to form the Union Bank of Switzerland.

== History ==
The Bank in Winterthur was founded in 1862 in Winterthur, Switzerland with an initial share capital of 5 million CHF. The bank, which was established by a group of local businessmen, operated primarily as a commercial bank, providing financing for a range of companies and projects. The bank would be involved in funding the Swiss Locomotive and Machine Works, the Hotel Baur au Lac in Zurich and many other companies. The bank capitalized on its location at an important Swiss railroad junction and its large warehousing facilities allowed the bank to take advantage of the dramatic rise in cotton prices caused by the American Civil War. The Bank in Winterthur saw its share capital double by the end of the war.

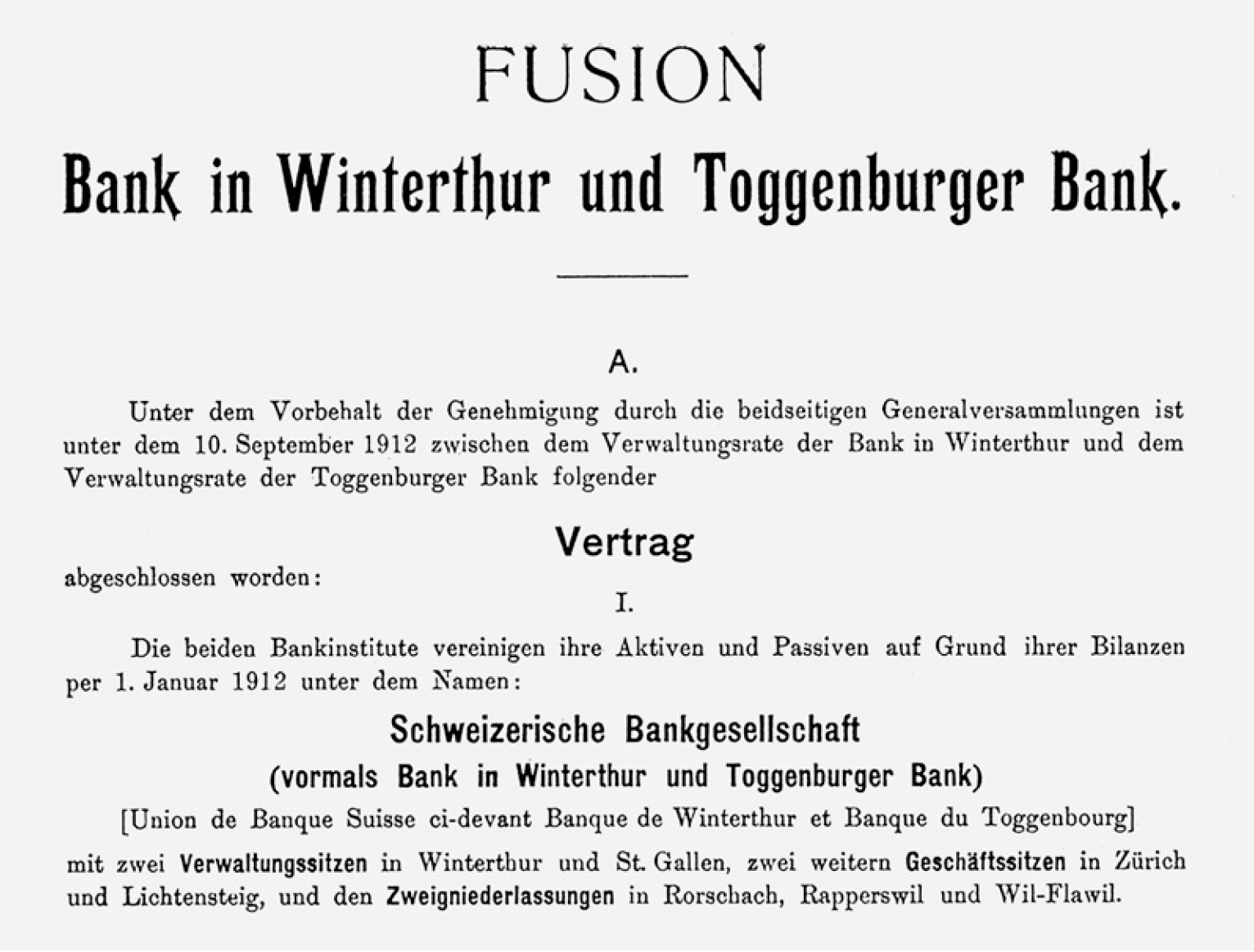
Announcement of the 1912 merger between Bank in Winterthur and Toggenburger Bank to form Schweizerische Bankgesellschaft (Union Bank of Switzerland)

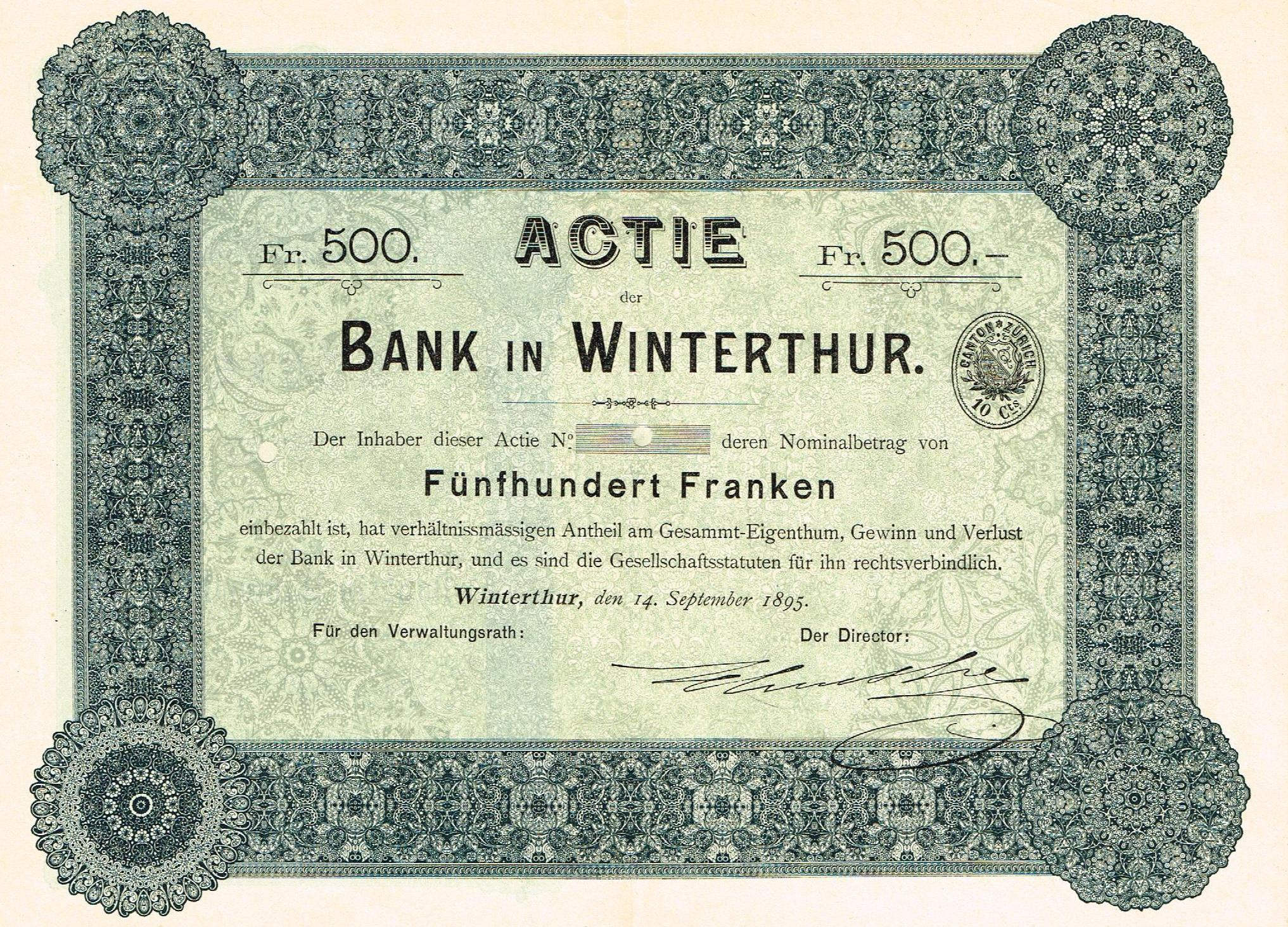
Unissued share of the Bank in Winterthur from the 14. September 1895

In the mid-1880s, The Bank in Winterthur experienced financial difficulties. The bank's involvement in the financing of the ill-fated private Schweizerische Nationalbahn (Swiss National Railway) resulted in the loss of one-fifth of the bank's capital reserves in 1887.

The Union Bank of Switzerland was formed in 1912 when the Bank in Winterthur merged with the Toggenburger Bank. The combined bank had total assets of 202 million CHF and a total shareholders' equity of 46 million CHF. This combination was part of a larger trend toward concentration in the banking sector in Switzerland at the time. Through the next few years, the bank would begin to shift its operations to Zurich from its historical headquarters in the cities of Winterthur and St. Gallen, Switzerland. In 1917, UBS completed construction of a new headquarters in Zurich on Bahnhofstrasse, considered to be the Wall Street of Switzerland.

The new bank used different names in its three core languages: German, French and English. In German, the bank was Schweizerische Bankgesellschaft and was known by the initials SBG. The original English name for the combined bank was the Swiss Banking Association, but it was later changed to Union Bank of Switzerland in 1921 to mirror the French form of the name: Union de Banques Suisses. The bank's logo, introduced in 1966, would later reflect both the German SBG and the English and French name UBS.
