= Union Bank of Switzerland =

Swiss investment bank and financial services company

- Industry: Banking; Financial services Investment services
- Predecessor: Bank in Winterthur (est. 1862); Toggenburger Bank (est. 1863)
- Founded: 1912; 114 years ago
- Founder: Rudolf Ernst; Carl Emil Grob-Halter
- Defunct: 1998
- Fate: Merged with Swiss Bank Corporation to form UBS
- Successor: UBS
- Headquarters: Zürich, Switzerland
- Total assets: ▲CHF416 billion (1996)
- Number of employees: 29,100 (1996)

Union Bank of Switzerland (UBS) (Note: French: Union de banques suisses, German: Schweizerischer Bankgesellschaft, Italian: Unione di Banche Svizzere) was a Swiss investment bank and financial services company located in Switzerland. The bank, which at the time was the second largest bank in Switzerland, merged with Swiss Bank Corporation in 1998 to become UBS. This merger formed what was then the largest bank in Europe and the second largest bank in the world.

UBS was formed in 1912 through the merger of the Bank in Winterthur and Toggenburger Bank, both founded in the early 1860s. UBS then continued to grow through acquisitions, including Aargauische Kreditanstalt in 1919, Eidgenössische Bank in 1945, Interhandel Basel in 1967, Phillips & Drew in 1986, and Schröder, Münchmeyer, Hengst & Co. in 1997 among others.

The historical UBS logo comprises the initials "UBS" horizontally, crossed by vertical "SBG", referring to the name of the bank in German, "Schweizerische Bankgesellschaft". "UBS" ceased to be considered a representational abbreviation for the Union Bank of Switzerland after the bank's 1998 merger with Swiss Bank Corporation and is today considered a standalone brand.

== History ==
=== Origins of the Union Bank of Switzerland ===
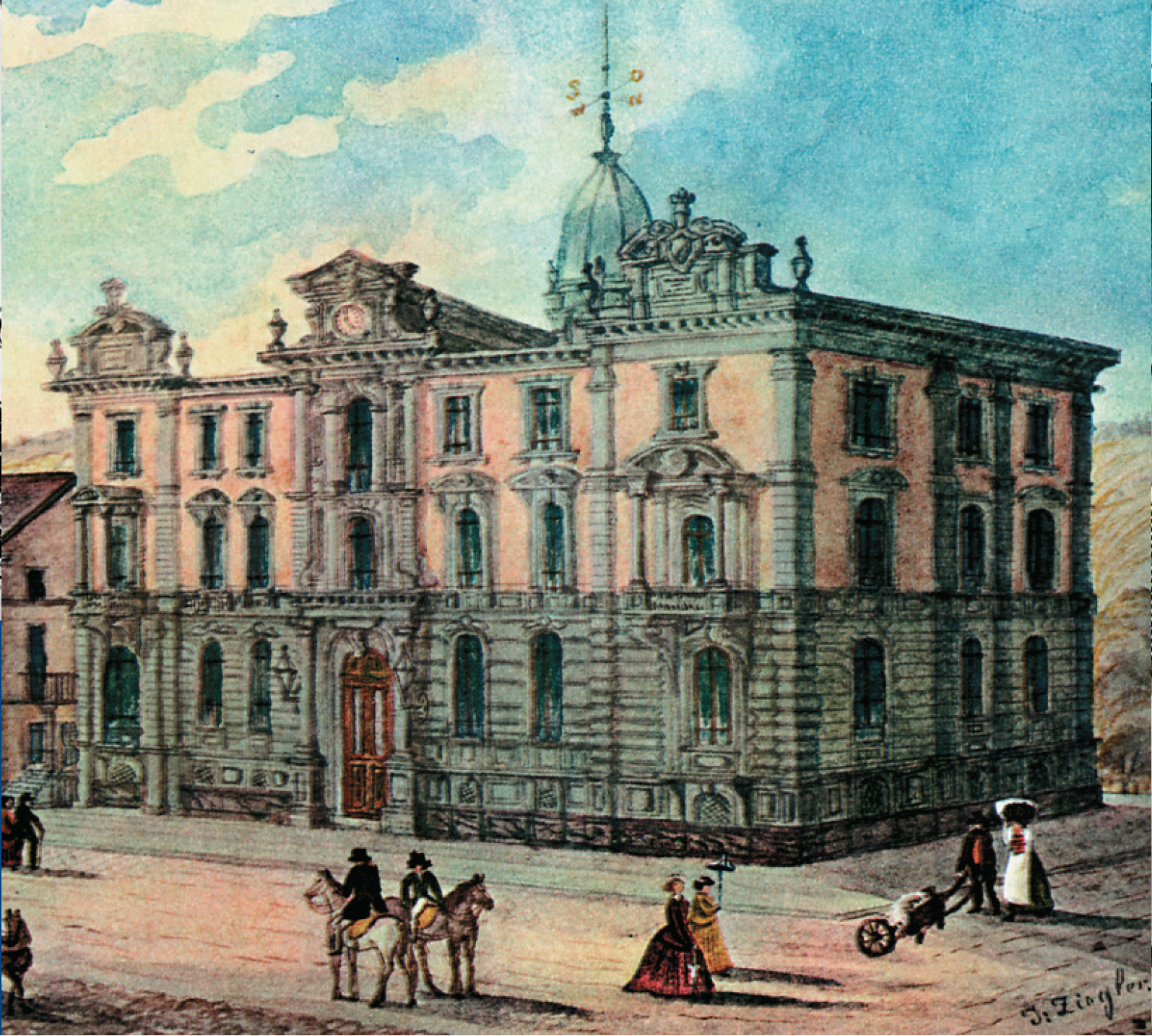
Bank in Winterthur, est. 1862

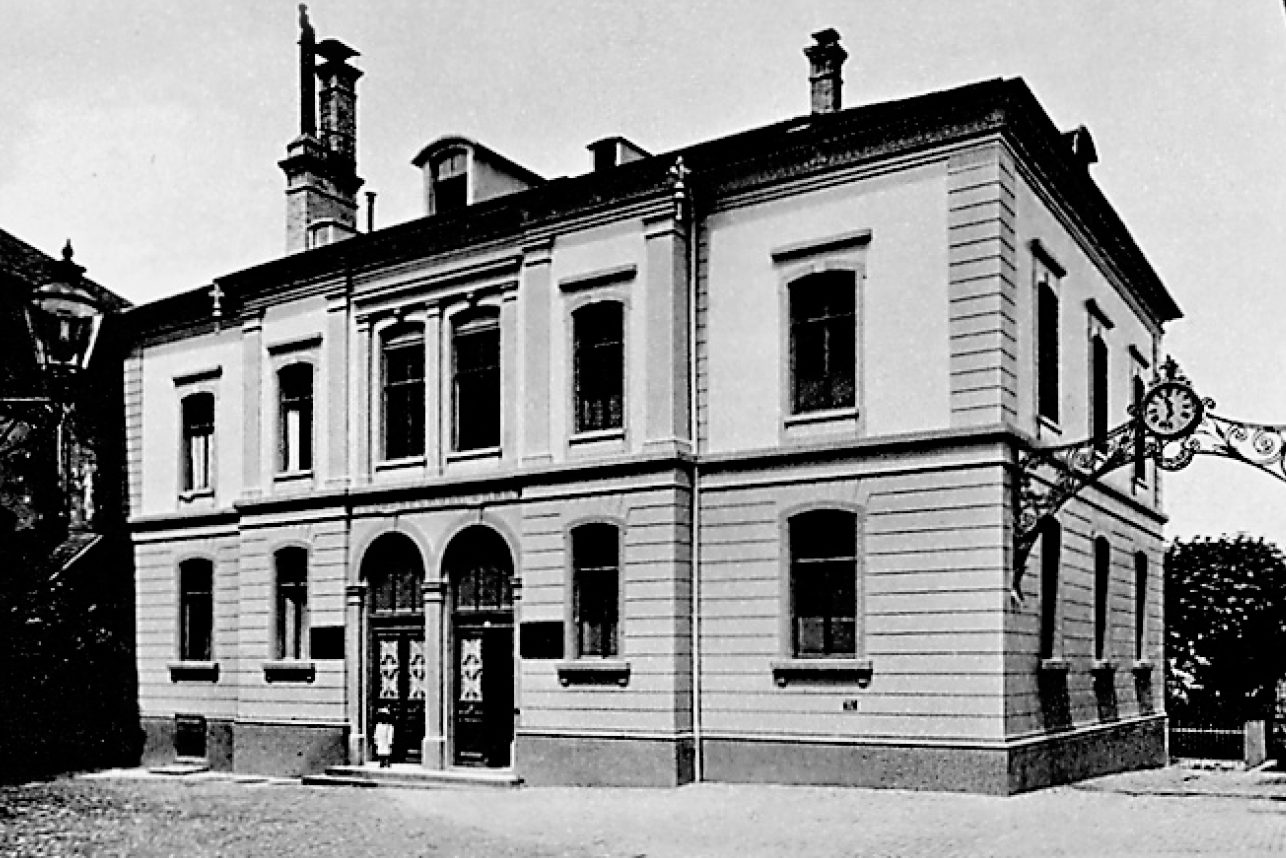
Toggenburger Bank, est. 1863

In 1862, The Bank in Winterthur was founded in Winterthur, Switzerland, with an initial share capital of CHF5 million. The Bank in Winterthur operated primarily as a commercial bank, providing financing for a range of companies and projects. The bank would be involved in funding the Swiss Locomotive and Machine Works, the hotel Baur au Lac in Zürich and many other companies. The bank capitalized on its location at an important Swiss railroad junction and its large warehousing facilities allowed the bank to take advantage of the dramatic rise in cotton prices caused by the American Civil War. The Bank in Winterthur saw its share capital double by the end of the war.

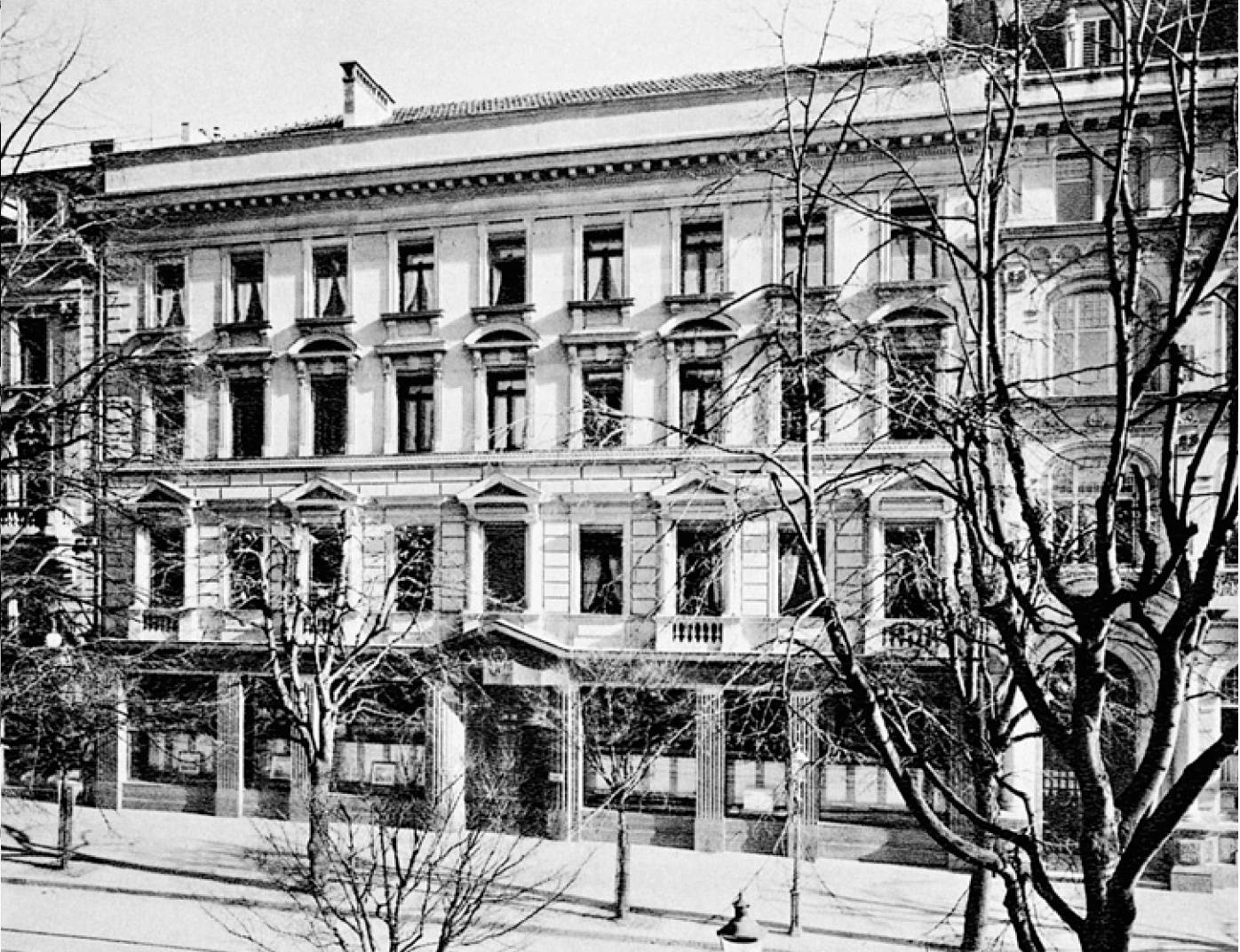
The bank's first offices in Zürich at Bahnhofstrasse 44 c. 1912

Meanwhile, in 1863, the Toggenburger Bank was founded in Lichtensteig, Switzerland with an initial share capital of CHF1.5 million. The Toggenburger Bank was a savings and mortgage bank for individual customers with a branch office network in Eastern Switzerland. In 1882, Toggenburger Bank opened a branch in St. Gallen in eastern Switzerland and began to shift its operations there through the end of the 19th century.

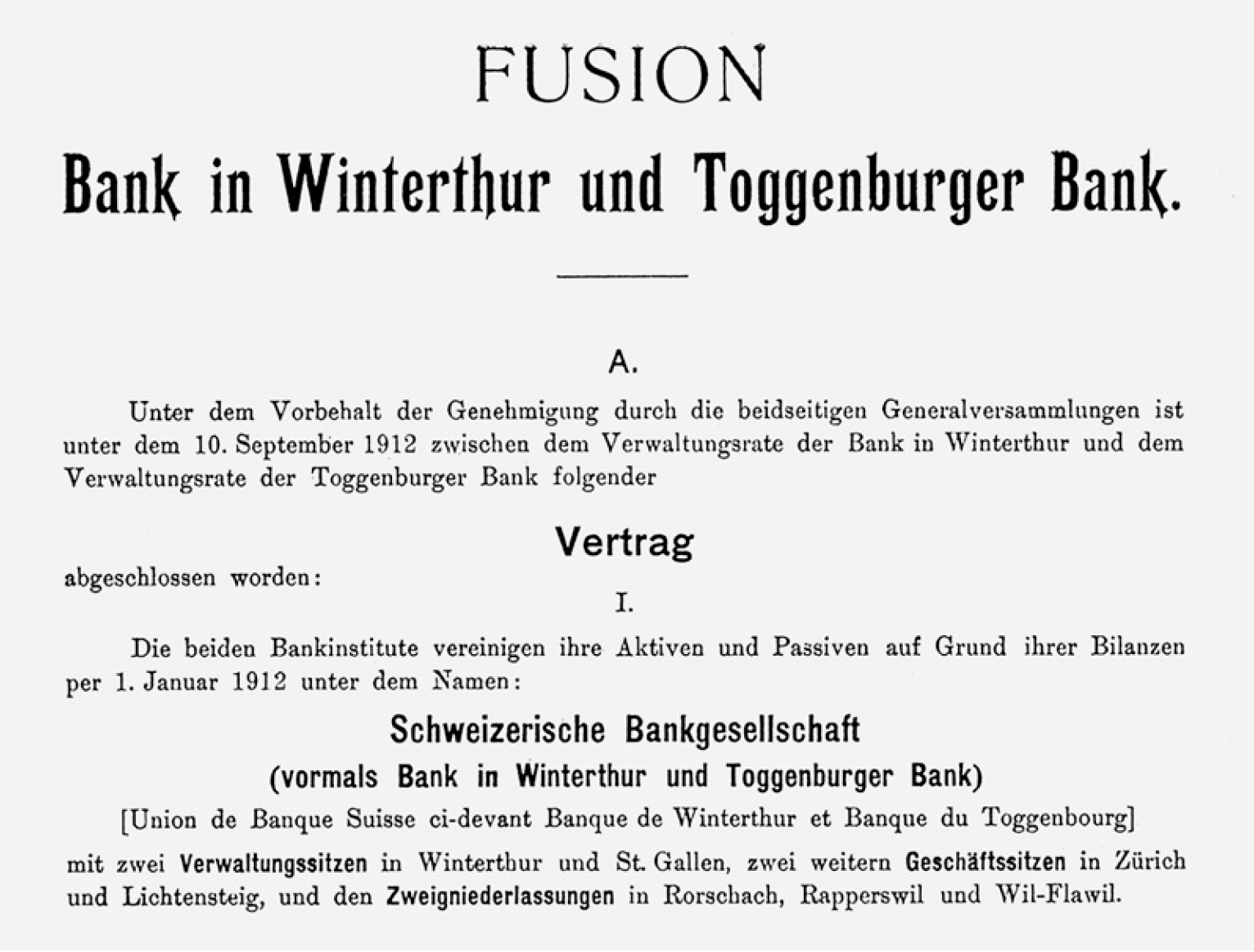
Announcement of the 1912 merger between Bank in Winterthur and Toggenburger Bank to form Schweizerische Bankgesellschaft (Union Bank of Switzerland)

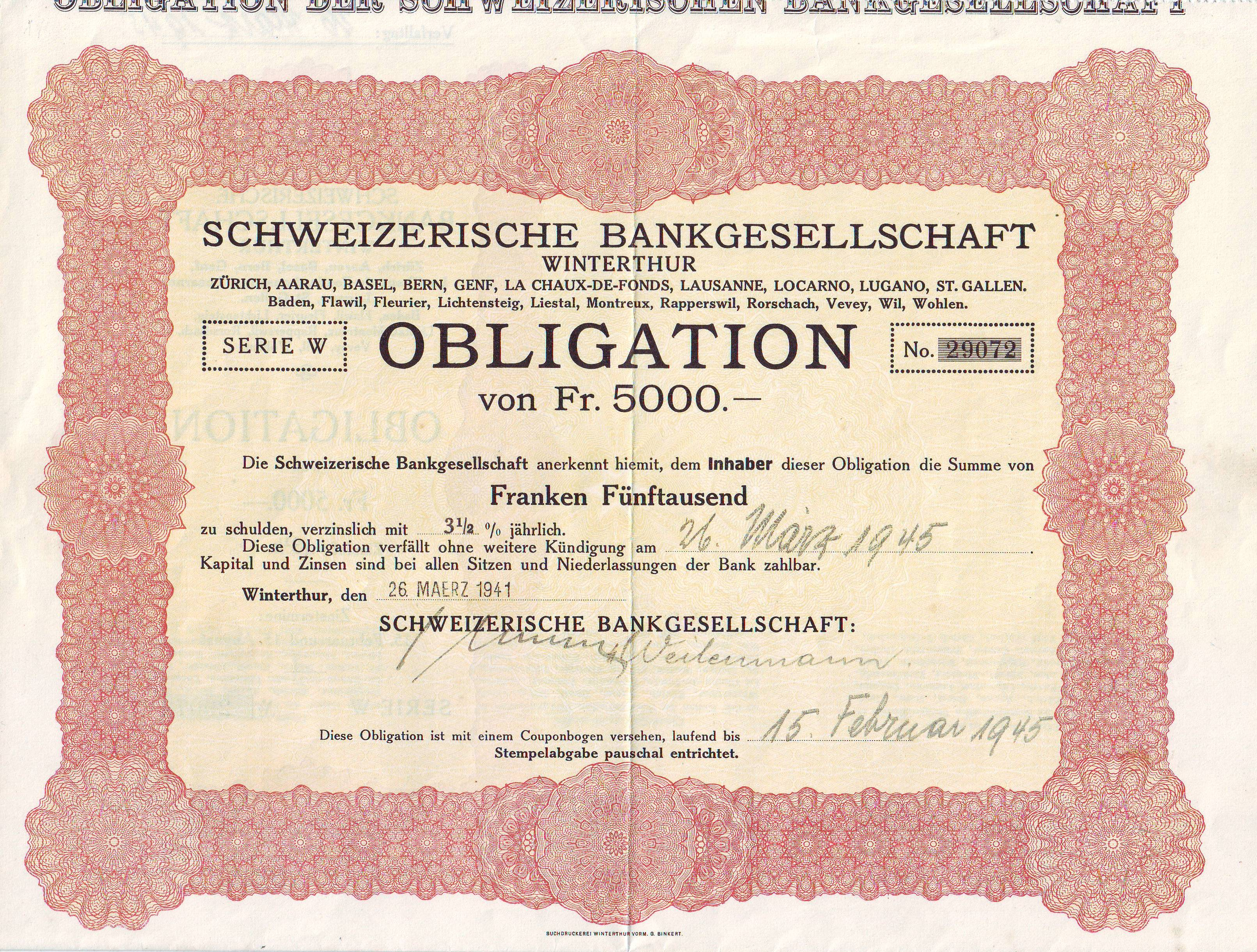
Bond of the Schweizerische Bankgesellschaft, issued 26 March 1941

The Union Bank of Switzerland was formed in 1912 when the Bank in Winterthur merged with the Toggenburger Bank. The combined bank had total assets of CHF202 million and a total shareholders' equity of CHF46 million. This combination was part of a larger trend toward concentration in the banking sector in Switzerland at the time. Through the next few years, the bank would begin to shift its operations to Zürich from its historical headquarters in the cities of Winterthur and St. Gallen, Switzerland. In 1917, UBS completed construction of a new headquarters, Münzhof, in Zürich's Bahnhofstrasse, considered to be the Wall Street of Switzerland.

The new bank used different names in its three core languages: German, French and English. In German, the bank was Schweizerische Bankgesellschaft and was known by the initials SBG. The original English name for the combined bank was the Swiss Banking Association, but it was later changed to Union Bank of Switzerland in 1921 to mirror the French form of the name: Union de Banques Suisses. The bank's logo, introduced in 1966, would later reflect both the German SBG and the English and French name UBS.

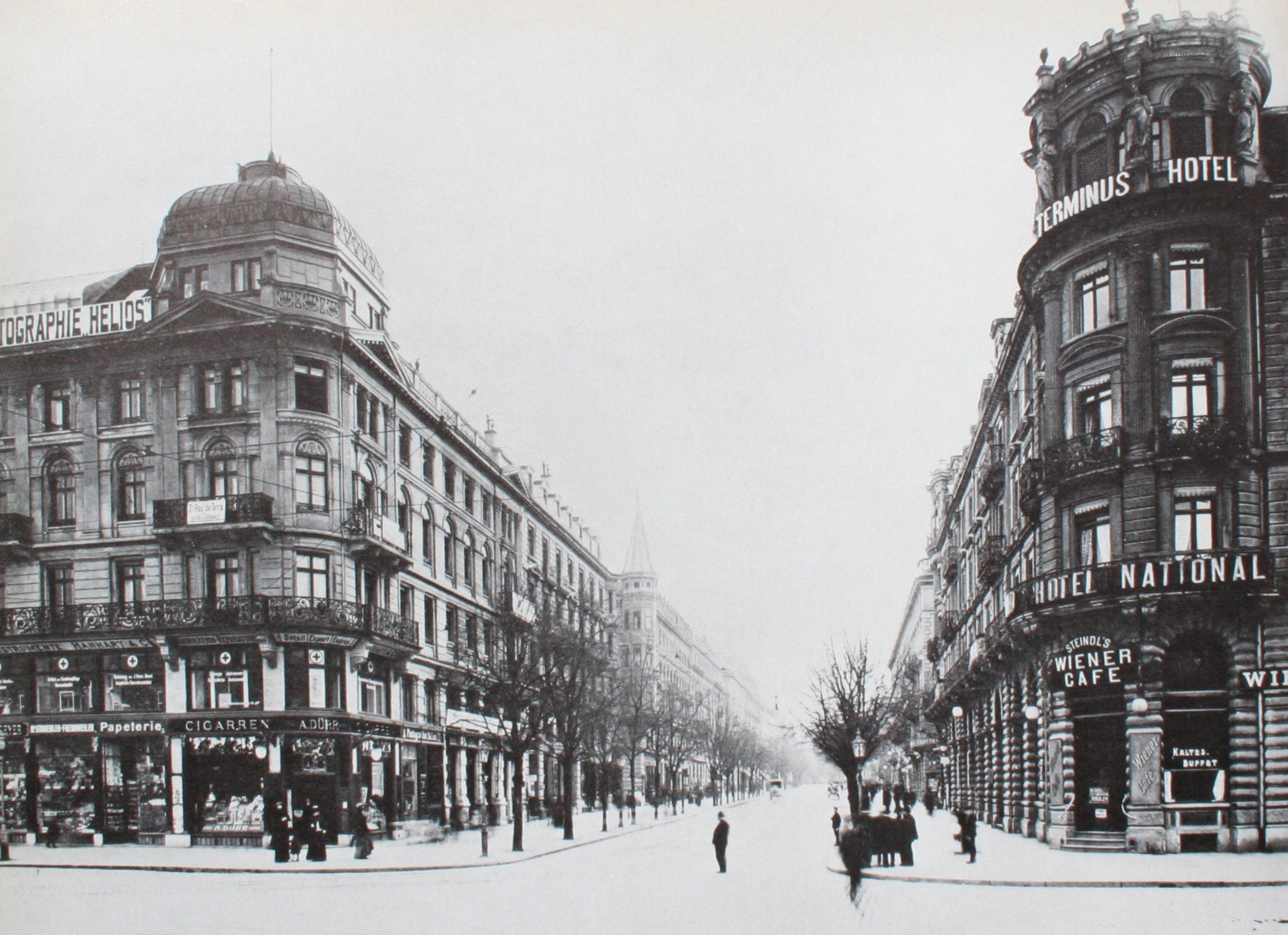
In 1917, the newly merged Swiss Banking Association (later UBS) opened a new headquarters on Bahnhofstrasse (pictured above) in Zürich.

UBS acquired a number of banks in its first decade as a combined bank and expanded its branch network, establishing representation throughout Switzerland by 1923. UBS acquired a controlling interest in Aargauische Creditanstalt in 1913 and Banque Ch. Masson & Cie. in 1916. Although the bank suffered during World War I and the postwar economic crises in Europe, UBS continued to make acquisitions after the conclusion of World War I. The bank purchased the remaining stake in Aargauische Creditanstalt in 1919 that it had not acquired in 1913. Also in 1919, the bank acquired Commandit-AG Weibel & Cie. in Fleurier and William Cuénod & Cie. In 1920, UBS acquired Banca Svizzera-Americana with branches in Locarno and Lugano; Unionbank Geneva and Banque Henry Rieckel & Cie., based in La Chaux-de-Fonds. Three years later, in 1923, UBS acquired the Schweizerische Vereinsbank in Bern establishing representation in the last of the major cities in Switzerland.

The Union Bank of Switzerland logo c. 1927. Until 1921, the bank was known as the Swiss Banking Association.

Through the Great Depression, UBS pared its assets considerably shrinking from CHF993 million in 1929 to CHF441 million at the end of 1935. The bank saw its shareholders' capital decline from CHF100 million in 1929 to CHF80 million in 1933 and then further to CHF40 million by 1936. However, the bank continued to acquire smaller, weaker competitors, purchasing Banca Unione di Credito in Lugano and Chiasso in 1935 followed by Berner Handelsbank in Bern in 1938. In 1937, UBS established Intrag AG, an asset management business responsible for investment trusts (i.e., mutual funds) and set up the "America-Canada Trust Fund AMCA". Over the years, Intrag would set up a series of other funds, including the "Mutual Fund for Swiss Stocks FONSA" and the "South Africa Trust Fund SAFIT".

The Bank in Winterthur and the Toggenburger Bank merge to form the Schweizerische Bankgesellschaft. Its French name is Union de Banques Suisses (UBS) and its Italian name is Unione di Banche Svizzere (UBS). The English name of the bank at first is Swiss Banking Association. In 1921 that somewhat inappropriate name is changed into Union Bank of Switzerland (UBS).

The merged bank shows the following figures for 1912: Total assets: CHF202 million. Shareholders' Equity: CHF46 million. Profit: CHF2.4 million.

Dr. Rudolf Ernst (1865–1956)

First Chairman of the Board of Directors of the merged bank from 1912 until 1941 is Rudolf Ernst, of Winterthur, until 1921 alternating with C. Emil Grob-Halter of Lichtensteig.

After the merger of the Bank in Winterthur and the Toggenburger Bank to form Union Bank of Switzerland (UBS), Dr. Rudolf Ernst became the merged bank's first chairman in 1912. Following his resignation in 1941, he was elected as an Honorary chairman of Union Bank of Switzerland.

Rudolf Ernst joined the Bank in Winterthur in 1895. He was also financial director of the City of Winterthur for 16 years. At the young age of 36, he was elected in 1901 to the Board of Directors of the Bank in Winterthur and as its chairman at the same time. During his chairmanship, the bank changed its focus from its original lending business and began to expand its issuing and asset management franchise. With the acquisition of the Bank in Baden in 1906, the bank gained a branch in Zürich and a seat on the stock exchange, one of the cornerstones for the successful merger in 1912 with the Toggenburger Bank to form Union Bank of Switzerland. Rudolf Ernst also held directorships on the boards of various industrial and insurance companies. Between 1912 and his retirement in 1941, he was chairman of the Board of Union Bank of Switzerland, in an alternating capacity with Carl Emil Grob-Halter, who held the chairmanship in 1916 and 1918 as the representative of the merger partner Toggenburger Bank.

=== Activities in World War II ===
On the eve of World War II, UBS was the recipient of a large influx of foreign funds for safekeeping. During the war, the bank's traditional business fell off and the Swiss government became their largest clients. Still, unlike many of its peers, UBS's business lagged through much of the war.

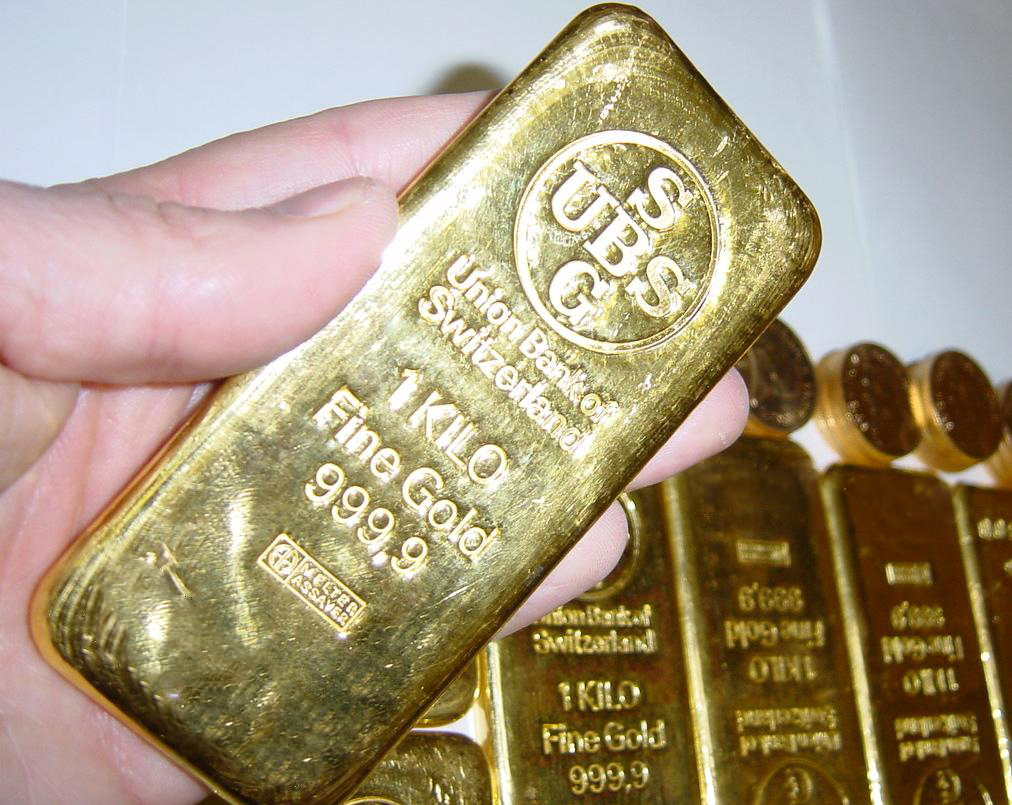
UBS "Gold Key" used to access an account number known only to the bearer

Decades after the war, it was demonstrated that Union Bank of Switzerland likely took active roles in trading stolen gold, securities and other assets during World War II. The issue of "unclaimed property" of Holocaust victims became a major issue for UBS in the mid-1990s and a series of revelations in 1997 brought the issue to the forefront of national attention in 1996 and 1997. UBS confirmed that a large number of accounts that had gone unclaimed as a result of the bank's policy of requiring death certificates from family members to claim the contents of the account. UBS's handling of these revelations were largely criticized and the bank received significant negative attention in the U.S. UBS came under significant pressure, particularly from American politicians, to compensate Holocaust survivors who were making claims against the bank.

In January 1997, Christoph Meili, a night watchman at the Union Bank of Switzerland, found employees shredding archives compiled by a subsidiary that had extensive dealings with Nazi Germany. The shredding was in direct violation of a recent Swiss law adopted in December 1996 protecting such material. UBS acknowledged that it had "made a deplorable mistake", but an internal historian maintained that the destroyed archives were unrelated to the Holocaust. Criminal proceedings then began against the archivist for possible violation of a recent Federal Document Destruction decree and against Meili for possible violation of bank secrecy, which is a criminal offence in Switzerland. Both proceedings were discontinued by the District Attorney in September 1997.

Meili was suspended from his job at the security company that served UBS, following a criminal investigation. Meili and his family left Switzerland for the United States where they were granted political asylum. By contrast, in the U.S., Meili was largely regarded as a hero and whistleblower and received a particularly warm reception from the American Jewish community.

In 1997, the World Jewish Congress lawsuit against Swiss banks (WJC) was launched to retrieve deposits made by victims of Nazi persecution during and prior to World War II. Negotiations involving Union Bank of Switzerland, Credit Suisse, the WJC and Stuart Eizenstat, on behalf of the U.S., ultimately resulted in a settlement of US$1.25 billion in August 1998. The settlement, which coincided with UBS's merger with Swiss Bank, together with the bank's embarrassment in the Long Term Capital Management collapse in 1998 brought a degree of closure to the issue.

=== 1945–1979 ===
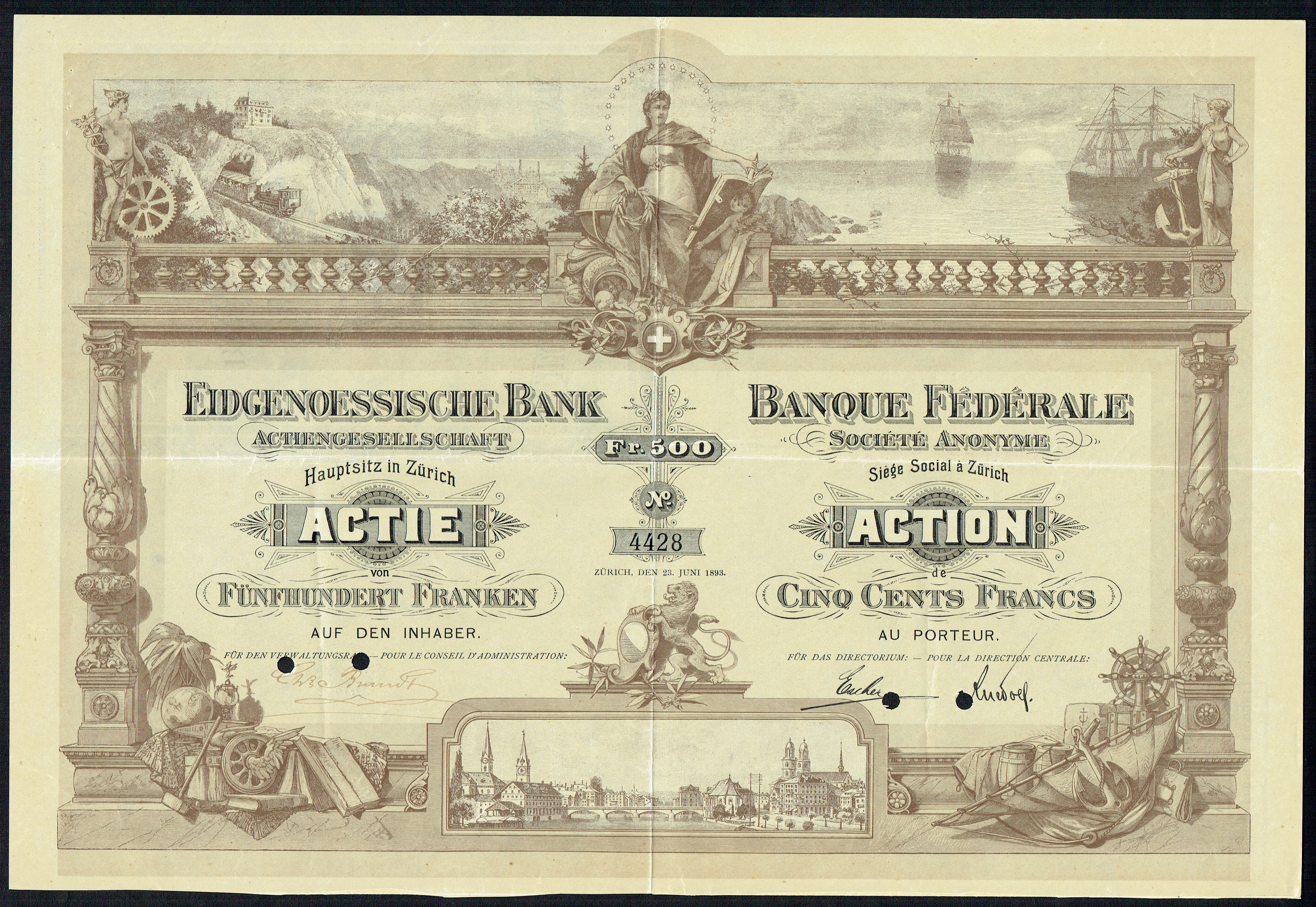
Share of the Eidgenössische Bank AG, issued 23 June 1893

Shortly after the end of World War II, UBS completed the acquisition of Eidgenössische Bank, a large Zürich-based bank that became insolvent. As a result of the merger, UBS exceeded CHF1 billion of assets for the first time and completed the transition of its operations to Zürich. Although UBS opened an office in New York in 1946, the bank remained primarily focused on its domestic business. Prior to the end of World War II, the Swiss banking landscape was dominated by Swiss Bank Corporation and Credit Suisse. UBS was among the next group of large banks that included Schweizerische Volksbank (Swiss Volksbank or Swiss Popular Bank) and Bank Leu. Throughout the 1950s and 1960s, the Union Bank of Switzerland, which was at best the third largest bank in Switzerland would catch up to its larger peers and by the 1970s surpass them in terms of size.

UBS opened branches and acquired a series of banks in Switzerland growing from 31 offices in 1950 to 81 offices by the beginning of the 1960s. Throughout the 1950s, UBS was the most acquisitive bank in Switzerland, acquiring Banque Palézieux & Cie. (1948), Volksbank Interlaken (1952), Weck, Aebi & Cie (1954), Banque Tissières fils & Cie. (1956), Banque de Sion (1956), Banque de Brigue (1957), the Crédit Gruyérien (1957), Crédit Sierrois (1957), Bank Cantrade AG (1960) and Volksbank in Visp (1960).

In addition to these bank acquisitions, UBS also acquired an 80% stake in Argor SA, a Swiss precious metal refinery founded in 1951, through whom they started to issue UBS branded gold bars. In 1973, the bank increased the stake to full 100% ownership only to withdraw by 1999 with ownership of the refinery changing to Hereaus & Management. Nevertheless, UBS continues to issue gold bars via Argor-Heraeus which is famous for the unique kinebar holographic technology it uses to provide enhanced protection against bank gold bar counterfeiting.

The Union Bank of Switzerland logo c. 1960, an early incarnation of its logo featuring crossing UBS and SBG acronyms. Later versions would have the English and French "UBS" running horizontally and the German SBG running vertically.

By 1962, UBS reached CHF6.96 billion of assets, narrowly edging ahead of Swiss Bank Corporation to become the largest bank in Switzerland temporarily. Through 1979, SBC was consistently the largest of the three major Swiss banks by assets, except for short periods in 1962 and then again in 1968 when UBS temporarily moved ahead of SBC. After 1979, UBS would firmly establish itself as the largest Swiss bank. UBS would retain this position for the next 15 years until Credit Suisse leapfrogged into the top spot following its 1993 acquisition of Schweizerische Volksbank (Swiss Volksbank) and later Winterthur Group.

UBS continued its rapid growth in the 1960s punctuated by the acquisition of Interhandel (Industrie- und Handelsbeteiligungen AG) in 1967. Interhandel, originally, was a large Swiss conglomerate that up until the 1960s had both financial as well as industrial holdings. Interhandel was the corporate successor of I.G. Chemie, which the U.S. government had claimed was a front for Germany's I.G. Farben during World War II. During the war, the U.S. government seized General Aniline & Film (later GAF Corporation), an Interhandel subsidiary, and it was not until 1963 that the long-running dispute between Interhandel and the U.S. government was resolved. The shares in GAF Corporation were sold in a highly competitive auction in 1965 and the proceeds were split between Interhandel and the U.S. government. As a result of the sale of GAF, at the time of its merger with UBS, Interhandel held substantial amounts of cash. The addition of the Interhandel capital, which propelled UBS into the top spot among Swiss banks in 1968, also made UBS one of the strongest banks in Europe and helped fuel the bank's further expansion in the late 1960s and 1970s. UBS consolidated four affiliated mortgage lenders and assumed their domestic retail operations. The bank further expanded into consumer lending through the acquisition of a series of Swiss financial businesses in 1969, including Banque Orca, Abri Bank Bern, Aufina Bank and AKO Bank.

UBS also began to intensify its overseas expansion. In 1967, UBS opened a full branch office in London, its first such office outside Switzerland. Prior to this, UBS had operated through a series of correspondent banks and representative offices. Three years later, UBS opened a branch office in New York. The bank also established a UK subsidiary in 1975 and a U.S. subsidiary in 1979 to focus on building the bank's presence in the underwriting of debt and equity securities. Nevertheless, UBS, which had traditionally concentrated its efforts on the domestic Swiss market, was the last of the three largest Swiss banks to establish a branch office in the U.S. and its securities operations were overshadowed by those of its two Swiss peers.

=== 1980–1998 ===
By the 1980s, the bank had undertaken a major push into the securities business internationally. The bank established a position as a leading European underwriter of Eurobonds and pulled off a major coup in 1985 by pricing a large bond offering for Nestlé, Rockwell, IBM, and Mobil at below market rates.

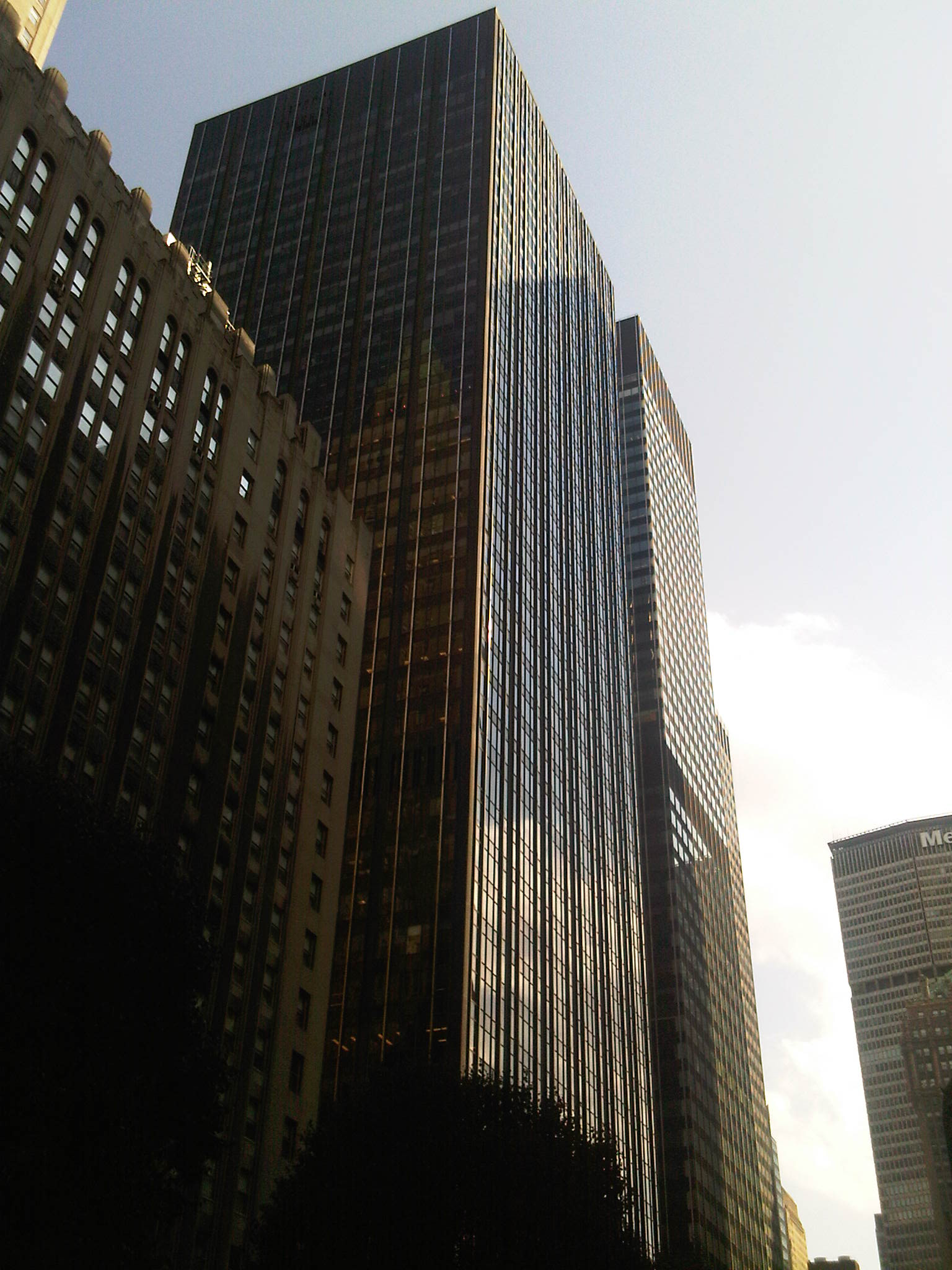
UBS's primary offices in the U.S., prior to its merger with SBC, were located at 299 Park Avenue in New York, which are used today as the New York headquarters of UBS Investment Bank.

The bank also made two major acquisitions in 1986, first it purchased Phillips & Drew an established British brokerage and asset management firm, founded in 1895. However, UBS initially had issues integrating Phillips & Drew. The firm lost £15 million when a rush of orders overwhelmed the firm's settlement system in 1987. Then the bank lost £48 million as a result of Philips & Drew positions in the October 1987 stock market crash. Between April 1987 and February 1988, UBS was required to spend as much as £115 million to shore up Phillips & Drew. Phillips & Drew unit returned to profitability in 1992 after years of losses. UBS also expanded into West Germany, acquiring Deutsche Länderbank in 1986.

In 1991, UBS made its first acquisition in the United States, purchasing Chase Investors Management Corporation, the asset management business of Chase Manhattan Bank. Chase Investors, which was established in 1972, was subsequently folded into UBS Asset Management after the acquisition. At the time of the acquisition, which resulted in approximately US$100 million for Chase, the business managed in excess of US$30 billion in public and private pension plans, as well as various financial assets of corporations, governments, foundations and endowments.

UBS also entered the life insurance business in 1993 establishing UBS Life. UBS formed a joint venture with Swiss Life in 1995, known as UBS Swiss Life. UBS took a 25% ownership position in Swiss Life in exchange for a 50% share in the joint venture.

UBS entered the 1990s clearly the largest and most conservative of the three large Swiss Banks. Unlike Swiss Bank and Credit Suisse, which had both made aggressive international acquisitions in trading and investment banking, UBS's investments had been more conservative in businesses such as asset management and life insurance while 60% of the bank's profits came from its even more conservative Swiss banking operations. In 1993, Credit Suisse outbid UBS for Switzerland's Swiss Volksbank, the fifth largest bank in Switzerland which had run into financial difficulties in the early 1990s. The acquisition propelled Credit Suisse ahead of UBS as the largest bank in Switzerland for the first time. UBS instead settled on a group of less audacious acquisitions, purchasing a group of smaller banks in Switzerland in 1994 and then acquiring the Cantonal Bank of Appenzell-Ausserrhoden in 1996.

In its final acquisition, prior to the merger with Swiss Bank no Corporation, the bank acquired Schröder, Münchmeyer, Hengst & Co. from Lloyds TSB in 1997 in order to further penetrate the German investment banking market as well as the market for wealthy private clients. Schröder Münchmeyer Hengst was formed through the 1969 merger of three German banks: Schroeder Brothers & Co., Muenchmeyer & Co. and Frederick Hengst & Co. (formerly known as Bank Siegmund Merzbach).

=== Merger with Swiss Bank Corporation ===
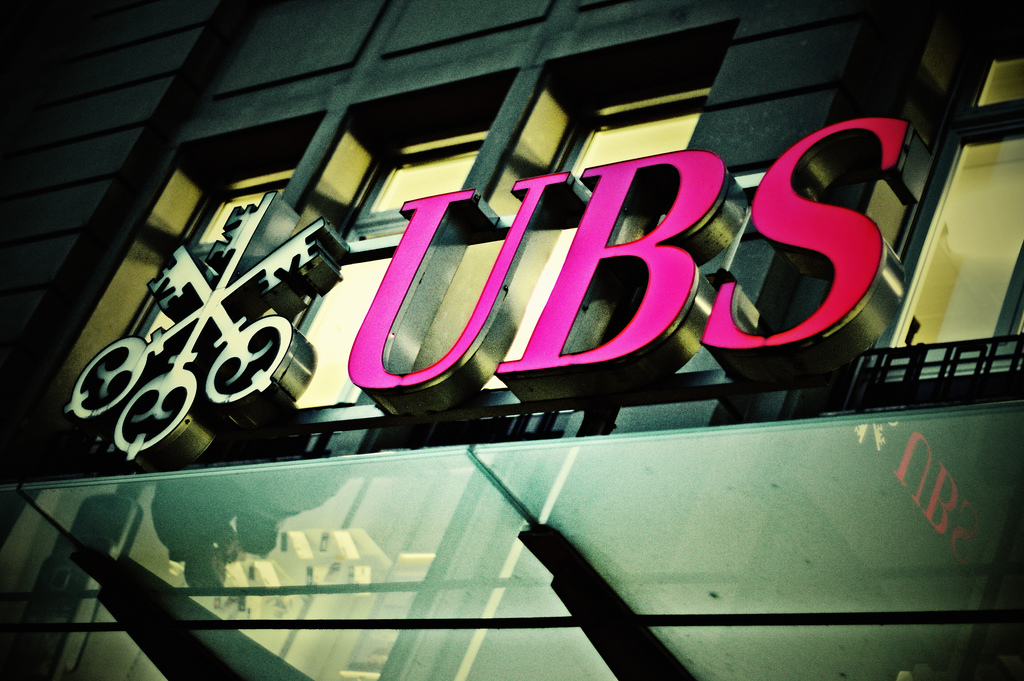
The combined UBS logo incorporated UBS's name with SBC's "three keys" symbol.

During the mid-1990s, UBS came under fire from dissident shareholders, critical of the bank's relatively conservative management and lower return on equity. Martin Ebner, through his investment trust, BK Vision became the largest shareholder in UBS and attempted to force a major restructuring of the bank's operations. The battles between Ebner and UBS management proved a distraction to the bank in the mid-1990s. Looking to take advantage of the situation, Credit Suisse approached UBS about a merger that would have created the second largest bank in the world in 1996. UBS's management and board unanimously rebuffed the proposed merger. Ebner, who supported the idea of a merger, led a major shareholder revolt that resulted in the replacement of UBS's chairman, Robert Studer. Studer's successor Mathis Cabiallavetta would be one of the key architects of the merger with Swiss Bank Corporation.

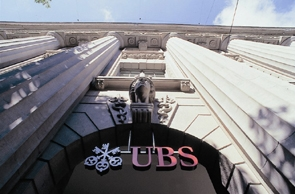
The Union Bank of Switzerland's principal office at Bahnhofstrasse 45 in Zürich served as the headquarters for the combined bank.

On 8 December 1997, Union Bank of Switzerland and Swiss Bank Corporation announced an all-stock merger. At the time of the merger, Union Bank of Switzerland and Swiss Bank Corporation were the second and third largest banks in Switzerland, respectively both trailing Credit Suisse. Discussions between the two banks had begun several months earlier, less than a year after rebuffing Credit Suisse's merger overtures.

The all-stock merger resulted in the creation UBS AG, a huge new bank with total assets of more than US$590 billion. Also referred to as the "New UBS" to distinguish itself from the former Union Bank of Switzerland, the combined bank became the second largest in the world, at that time, behind only the Bank of Tokyo-Mitsubishi. Additionally, the merger pulled together the banks' various asset management businesses to create the world's largest money manager, with approximately US$910 billion in assets under management.

The merger, which was billed as a merger of equals, resulted in UBS's shareholders receiving 60% of the combined company and Swiss Bank's shareholders receiving the remaining 40% of the bank's common shares. UBS's Mathis Cabiallavetta became chairman of the new bank while Swiss Bank's Marcel Ospel was named chief executive officer. However, it quickly became evident that from a management perspective, it was Swiss Bank that was buying UBS as nearly 80% of the top management positions were filled by legacy Swiss Bank professionals. Additionally, UBS professionals suffered more headcount reductions, particularly in the investment banking unit where there were heavy cuts in the corporate finance and equities businesses. The more severe cuts at UBS were an acknowledgment that prior to the merger Swiss Bank Corporation had built a global investment banking business, Warburg Dillon Read through its acquisitions of Dillon Read in New York and S.G. Warburg in London. Swiss Bank was generally considered to be further along than UBS in developing its international investment banking business, particularly in the higher margin advisory businesses where Warburg Dillon Read was considered to be the more established platform. UBS, on the other hand had a stronger retail and commercial banking business in Switzerland and both banks had notably strong asset management capabilities.

After the merger was completed, it was widely speculated that a series of losses suffered by UBS on its equity derivative positions in late 1997 was a contributing factor in pushing UBS management to consummate the merger. It would become clear that the derivatives losses prompted UBS to accept the terms proposed by Swiss Bank more readily than they otherwise would have.

=== Long-Term Capital Management ===
Union Bank of Switzerland, suffering criticism of its conservative business model, was looking for ways to catch up to its key Swiss rivals and viewed LTCM as the type of client that could help accelerate the bank's growth. In 1997, UBS entered into a financing arrangement with LTCM and the hedge fund quickly became the bank's largest client, generating US$15 million in fees for UBS. Union Bank of Switzerland sold LTCM a 7-year European call option on 1 million shares in LTCM, then valued at about US$800 million. It hedged this option by purchasing a US$800 million interest in LTCM and invested a further US$300 million in the hedge fund. Following the merger, Swiss Bank managers were surprised to discover the massive exposure to LTCM at UBS. Ultimately, UBS was unable to sell or hedge its interest in LTCM as its value declined in the summer of 1998.

By November 1998, UBS's losses from its exposure to LTCM were estimated at CHF790 million. UBS would prove to be the largest single loser in the LTCM collapse, ultimately writing off CHF950 million. The Federal Reserve Bank of New York organized a bailout of US$3.625 billion by the hedge fund's major creditors to avoid a wider collapse in the financial markets. UBS contributed US$300 million to the bailout effort, which would largely be recovered. In the aftermath of the LTCM collapse, Mathis Cabiallavetta resigned as chairman of UBS along with three other executives.

=== Acquisition history ===
Union Bank of Switzerland, prior to its merger with Swiss Bank Corporation was the result of the combination of dozens of individual firms, many of which date to the 19th century. The following is an illustration of the company's major mergers and acquisitions and historical predecessors, although this is not necessarily a comprehensive list:

- Union Bank of Switzerland
  - Union Bank of Switzerland (originally Swiss Banking Association, merged 1912)
    - Bank in Winterthur
      (est. 1862)
    - Toggenburger Bank
      (est. 1863)
  - Aargauische Kreditanstalt (merged 1915, acq. 1919)
    - Aargauische Kreditanstalt
      (est. 1872)
    - Bank in Baden
      (est. 1863)
  - Eidgenössische Bank
    (est. 1863, acq. 1945)
  - Interhandel
    (est. 1928, acq. 1967)
  - Phillips & Drew
    (est. 1895 as G.A. Phillips & Co., acq. 1986)
  - Chase Investors Management Corporation
    (est. 1972 as subsidiary of
    Chase Manhattan Bank, acq. 1991)
  - Schröder, Münchmeyer, Hengst & Co. (merged 1969, acq. 1997)
    - Schröder Brothers & Co.
      (est. 1846)
    - Münchmeyer & Co.
      (est. 1855)
    - Frederick Hengst & Co.
