= 2016 United States House of Representatives elections in Virginia =

- November 8, 2016

All 11 Virginia seats to the United States House of Representatives
	Majority party	Minority party
Party	Republican	Democratic
Last election	8	3
Seats won	7	4
Seat change	▼1	▲1
Popular vote	1,843,010	1,859,426
Percentage	48.74%	49.17%
Swing	▼4.82%	▲9.55%

Republican hold
Democratic hold Democratic gain
Republican
50–60%
60–70%
70–80%
80–90%
Democratic
40–50%
50–60%
60–70%
70–80%
80–90%

The 2016 United States House of Representatives elections in Virginia were held on November 8, 2016, to elect a U.S. representative from each of Virginia's 11 congressional districts. The elections coincided with the 2016 U.S. presidential election, as well as House of Representatives elections in other states, U.S. Senate elections and various state and local elections. The primaries were held on June 14.

Virginia was one of two states in which the party that won the state's popular vote did not win a majority of seats in 2016, the other state being Wisconsin. As of 2026, this is the last time the Republicans won a majority of House seats in Virginia.

== Statewide results ==
Party	Candidates	Votes		Seats		
Party	Candidates	No.	%	No.	+/–	%
Democratic Party	11	1,859,426	49.17%	4	▲1	36.36%
Republican Party	10	1,843,010	48.74%	7	▼1	63.64%
Write-in	11	42,552	1.13%	0	Steady	0.0%
Independent	3	36,580	0.96%	0	Steady	0.0%
Total	35	3,781,568	100%	11	Steady	100%

Statewide popular vote
Democratic	49.17%
Republican	48.74%
Write-in	1.13%
Independent	0.96%

House seats
Republican	63.64%
Democratic	36.36%

== 2016 Virginia redistricting ==
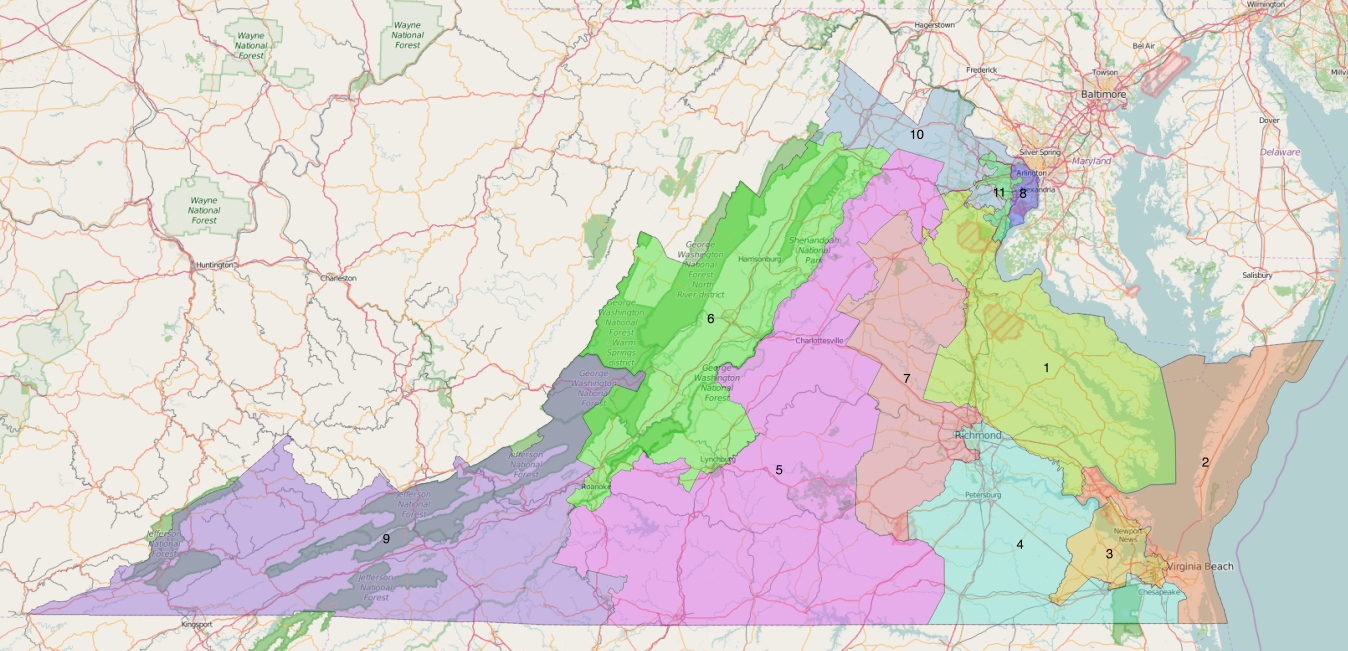
This image shows the 2016-2020 court-ordered VA Congressional districts.

In October 2013, three voters from Virginia's Third Congressional District filed a lawsuit challenging Governor Bob McDonnell's 2012 congressional redistricting plan. The plaintiffs argued that the map violated the Constitution by concentrating Black voters disproportionately within the district, a practice known as racial gerrymandering.

On October 7, 2014, a three-judge panel in the United States District Court ruled that the map was unconstitutional and violated the Equal Protection Clause of the 14th amendment. Despite this ruling, the court allowed the existing map to be used for the 2014 House Elections and ordered the Virginia General Assembly to redraw the districts by April 1, 2015.

In response, ten current and former Republican members of the House of Representatives appealed the decision to the Supreme Court, seeking to overturn the lower court's ruling. However, the Supreme Court remanded the case to the District Court for reconsideration in light of its recent decision in Alabama Legislative Black Caucus v. Alabama, a case involving racial gerrymandering.

On June 5, 2015, the District Court reaffirmed its previous ruling that the congressional map was unconstitutional and required the General Assembly to redraw the districts by September 1, 2015. However, the General Assembly failed to meet the deadline. Consequently, the District Court appointed a special master to create a new redistricting plan, which was approved on January 7, 2016.

The Republican House members subsequently petitioned the Supreme Court to pause the implementation of the new map, arguing that the original appeal regarding jurisdiction had not yet been resolved. The Supreme Court denied the request, allowing for the revised map to be used for the 2016 House primaries and general election. On March 21, 2016, the Supreme Court heard oral arguments on the appeal but ultimately dismissed it, ruling that the Republican House members lacked standing under Article III of the Constitution.

Following the Supreme Court's decision, some Republican members of the House filed another lawsuit challenging the District Court's revised map. Only three of the ten plaintiffs appeared before the Supreme Court, with Representative Randy Forbes arguing that the new map would alter the Fourth District from a Republican-leaning to a Democratic-leaning constituency, potentially jeopardizing his reelection. The plaintiffs contended that the new map unfairly disadvantaged incumbents. However, the Supreme Court upheld the District Court's redistricting plan, affirming its constitutionality.

== District 1 ==
2016 Virginia's 1st congressional district election
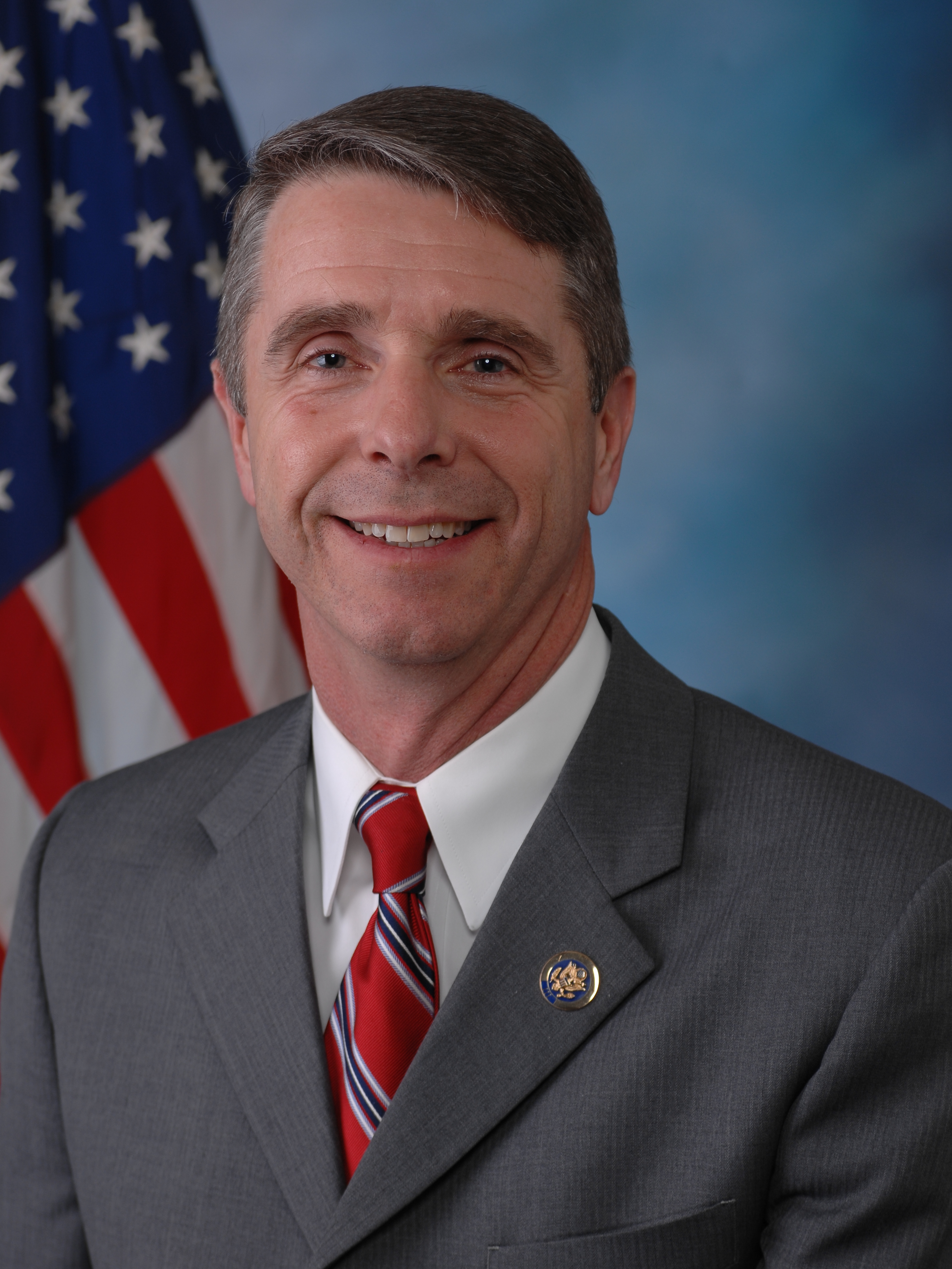

Nominee	Rob Wittman	Matt Rowe
Party	Republican	Democratic
Popular vote	230,213	140,785
Percentage	59.9%	36.6%
- Wittman: 40–50% 50–60% 60–70% 70–80% 80–90% Rowe: 40–50% 50–60% 60–70% 70–80% No votes
U.S. Representative before election
Rob Wittman
Republican
Elected U.S. Representative
Rob Wittman
Republican

Republican Rob Wittman had represented Virginia's 1st congressional district since 2007. He was re-elected in 2014 with 63% of the vote.

Wittman announced that he intended to run for governor in 2017, but would still run for re-election in 2016.

=== Republican primary ===
==== Candidates ====
===== Nominee =====
- Rob Wittman, incumbent U.S. Representative

=== Democratic convention ===
A convention was scheduled for May 21 to select a nominee, with a filing deadline of May 7. Bowling Green Town Councilman Matt Rowe was the only candidate to file before the deadline and was thus automatically nominated.

==== Candidates ====
===== Nominee =====
- Matt Rowe, Bowling Green Town Councilman

Gail Parker also ran.

=== General election ===
==== Predictions ====
Source	Ranking	As of
The Cook Political Report	Safe R	November 7, 2016
Daily Kos Elections	Safe R	November 7, 2016
Rothenberg	Safe R	November 3, 2016
Sabato's Crystal Ball	Safe R	November 7, 2016
RCP	Safe R	October 31, 2016

==== Results ====
Virginia's 1st congressional district, 2016
Party	Candidate	Votes	%
Republican	Rob Wittman (incumbent)	230,213	59.9
Democratic	Matt Rowe	140,785	36.6
Independent	Glenda Parker	12,866	3.3
Write-in		737	0.2
Total votes		384,601	100.0
Republican hold			

== District 2 ==
2016 Virginia's 2nd congressional district election
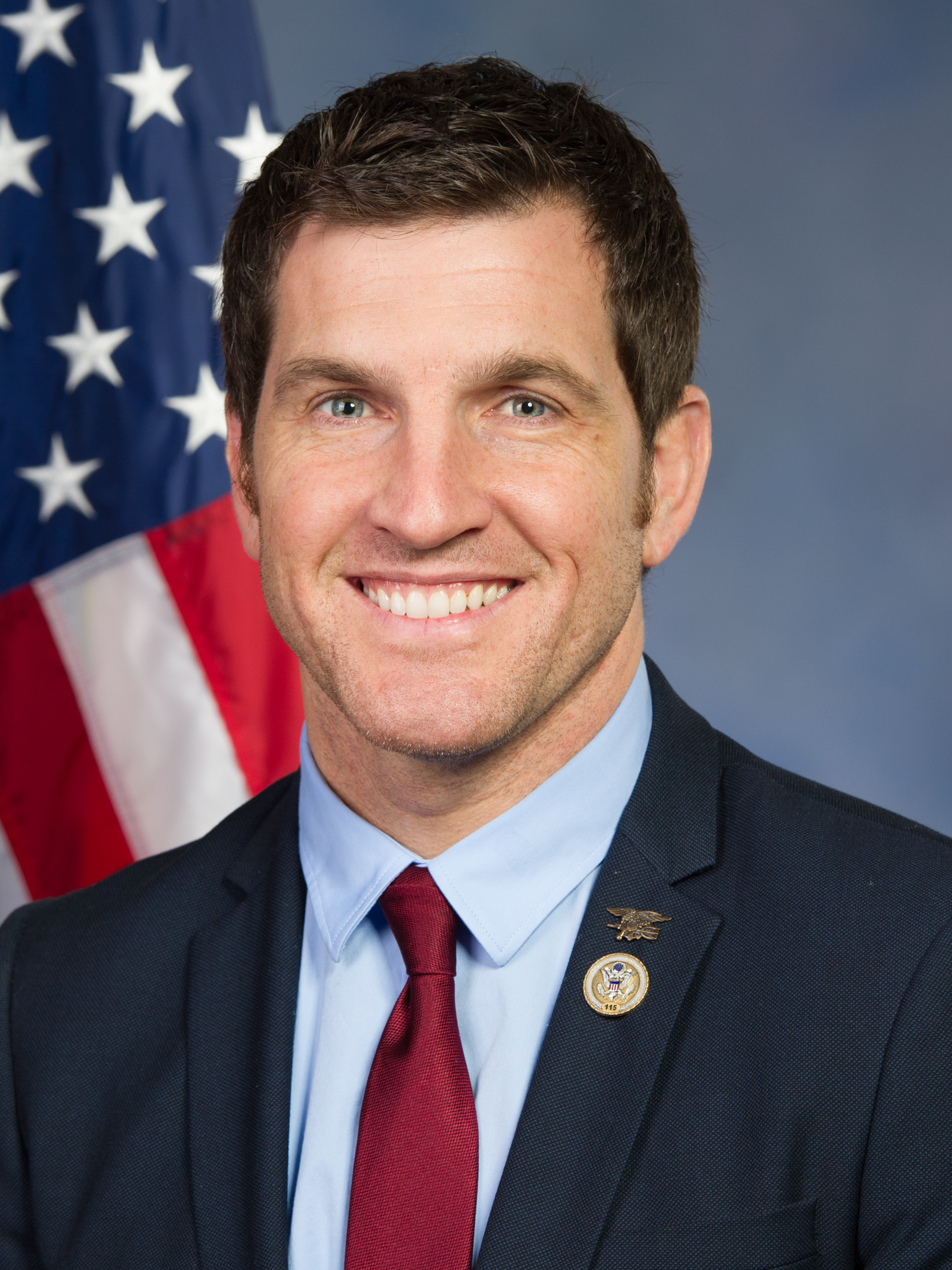

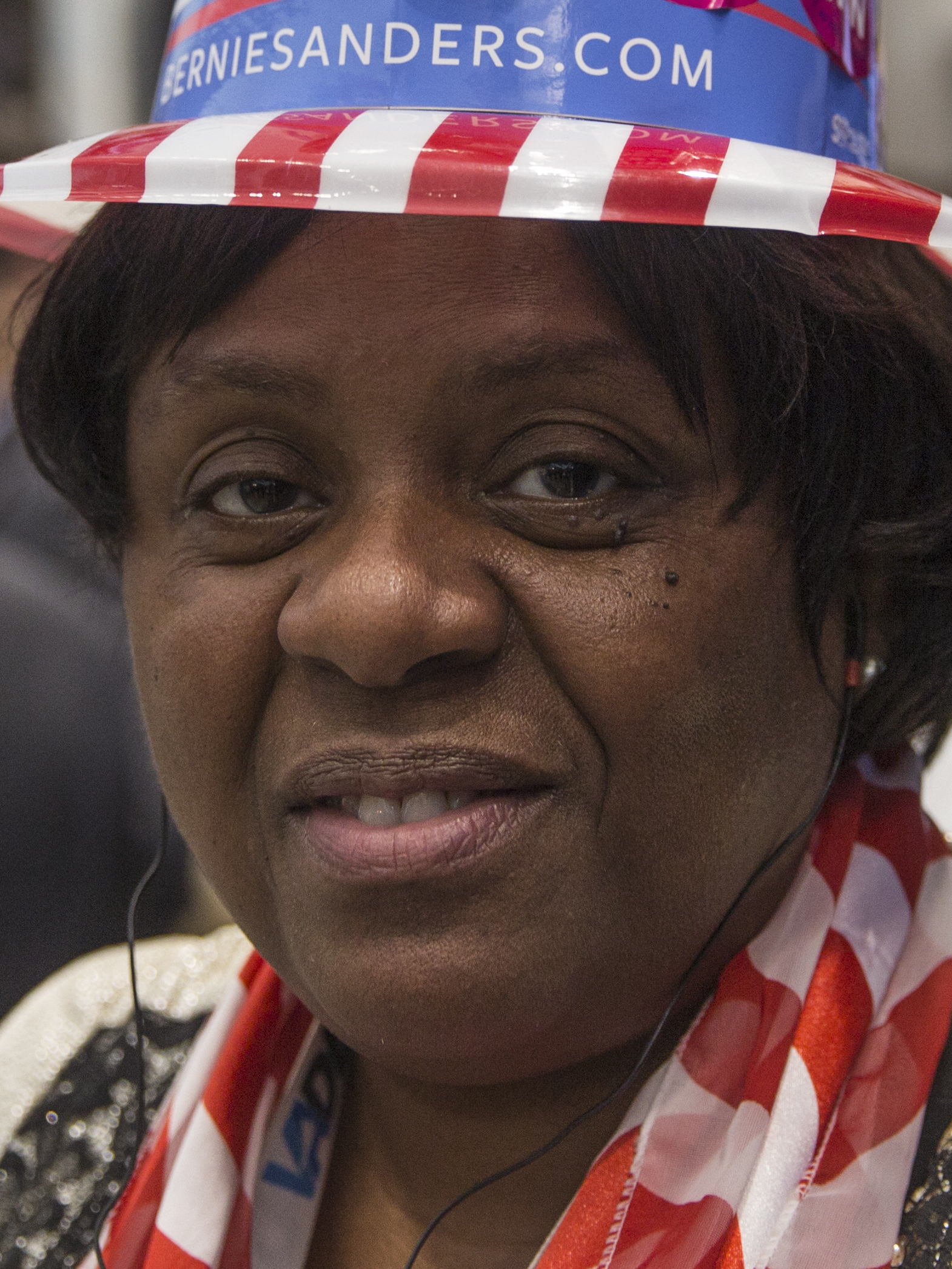
Nominee	Scott Taylor	Shaun D. Brown
Party	Republican	Democratic
Popular vote	190,475	119,440
Percentage	61.3%	38.5%
- Taylor: 50–60% 60–70% 70–80% 80–90% >90% Brown: 50–60% 60–70% 70–80% 80–90% >90%
U.S. Representative before election
Scott Rigell
Republican
Elected U.S. Representative
Scott Taylor
Republican

Republican Scott Rigell was the incumbent of the 2nd district, which had a PVI of R+2. He was first elected in 2010. He declined to seek re-election. The district encompassed Virginia Beach and surrounding areas.

=== Republican primary ===
==== Candidates ====
===== Nominee =====
- Scott Taylor, state delegate, candidate for this seat in 2010 and candidate for Mayor of Virginia Beach in 2008

===== Eliminated in primary =====
- Pat Cardwell, attorney
- Randy Forbes, incumbent U.S. Representative for Virginia's 4th congressional district

===== Declined =====
- Glenn Davis, state delegate
- Bill DeSteph, state senator
- Ben Loyola, defense contractor, candidate for the seat in 2010 and nominee for state senate in 2011
- Jeff McWaters, former state senator and founder and former CEO of Amerigroup
- Jason Miyares, state delegate
- Bert Mizusawa, Army Reserve major general and candidate for the seat in 2010
- Chris Stolle, state delegate
- Frank Wagner, state senator

==== Endorsements ====
Randy Forbes

Executive branch officials

- Seven former Secretaries of the Navy, including former US Senator John Warner

U.S. Representatives

- Scott Rigell, incumbent U.S. Representative, 2nd District
- Rob Wittman, incumbent U.S. Representative, 1st District

State legislators

- John Cosgrove, state senator
- Glenn Davis, state delegate
- Gordon Helsel, state delegate
- Barry Knight, state delegate
- Jason Miyares, state delegate
- Brenda Pogge, state delegate
- Ron Villanueva, state delegate

Organizations

- Tidewater Tea Party Alliance

Local officials

- John Atkinson, Virginia Beach City Treasurer
- Heather Cordasco, former James City County School Board
- Linda Curtis, Hampton Vice Mayor
- Bob Deeds, James City-Williamsburg Sheriff
- Danny Diggs, York-Poquoson Sheriff
- Bobby Dyer, Virginia Beach City Council
- Jim Funk, former York County Board of Supervisors
- Buddy Green, Poquoson City Council
- George Hrishak, former York County Board of Supervisors
- Gene Hunt, Poquoson Mayor
- Bob McCabe, Norfolk Sheriff
- John Moss, Virginia Beach City Council
- Kevin Onizuk, James City County Board of Supervisors
- Doug Pons, Williamsburg City Council
- Sue Sadler, James City County Board of Supervisors
- Phyllis Schaffly, Hampton School Board
- Tom Sheppard, York County Board of Supervisors
- Jeff Wassmer, York County Chairman
- Don Wiggins, former York County Board of Supervisors
- Walt Zaremba, York County Board of Supervisors
- Benny Zhang, Williamsburg City Council

Individuals

- Matt Schlapp, Chairman of the American Conservative Union
Scott Taylor

State legislators

- Bill DeSteph, state senator

Local officials

- Ken Stolle, Virginia Beach Sheriff

==== Results ====
County and independent city results Taylor: 50–60%; Forbes: 50–60%; 60–70%

Republican primary results
Party	Candidate	Votes	%
Republican	Scott Taylor	21,406	52.6
Republican	Randy Forbes (incumbent)	16,552	40.6
Republican	Pat Cardwell	2,773	6.8
Total votes		40,731	100.0

=== Democratic primary ===
Scott Rigell's retirement was expected to make the race competitive, with the Rothenberg & Gonzales Political Report immediately changing the rating from Safe to Lean Republican. However, due to the perceived strength of Congressman Forbes's entry into the race, Shaun Brown, a community activist in Hampton, VA who had originally planned to primary US Representative Bobby Scott (D) for the 3rd district, ended up being the only candidate to file for the primary, making her automatically the nominee.

==== Candidates ====
===== Nominee =====
- Shaun Brown, community activist

===== Declined =====
- Dave Belote, chair of the Virginia Beach Democratic Committee, retired Air Force colonel, former Nellis Air Force Base installation commander and 2015 state senate candidate
- Paul Hirschbiel, nominee in 2012
- Lynwood Lewis, state senator
- Andria McClellan, businesswoman, state senate candidate in 2013 and Norfolk City councilwoman
- Jody Wagner, former State Treasurer, former State Secretary of Finance, nominee in 2000 and nominee for lieutenant governor in 2009

=== General election ===
==== Endorsements ====
Scott Taylor (R)

State legislators

- Bill DeSteph, state senator

Local officials

- Ken Stolle, Virginia Beach Sheriff

==== Predictions ====
Source	Ranking	As of
The Cook Political Report	Safe R	November 7, 2016
Daily Kos Elections	Safe R	November 7, 2016
Rothenberg	Safe R	November 3, 2016
Sabato's Crystal Ball	Safe R	November 7, 2016
RCP	Safe R	October 31, 2016

==== Results ====
Virginia's 2nd congressional district, 2016
Party	Candidate	Votes	%
Republican	Scott Taylor	190,475	61.3
Democratic	Shaun D. Brown	119,440	38.5
Write-in		652	0.2
Total votes		310,567	100.0
Republican hold			

== District 3 ==
2016 Virginia's 3rd congressional district election
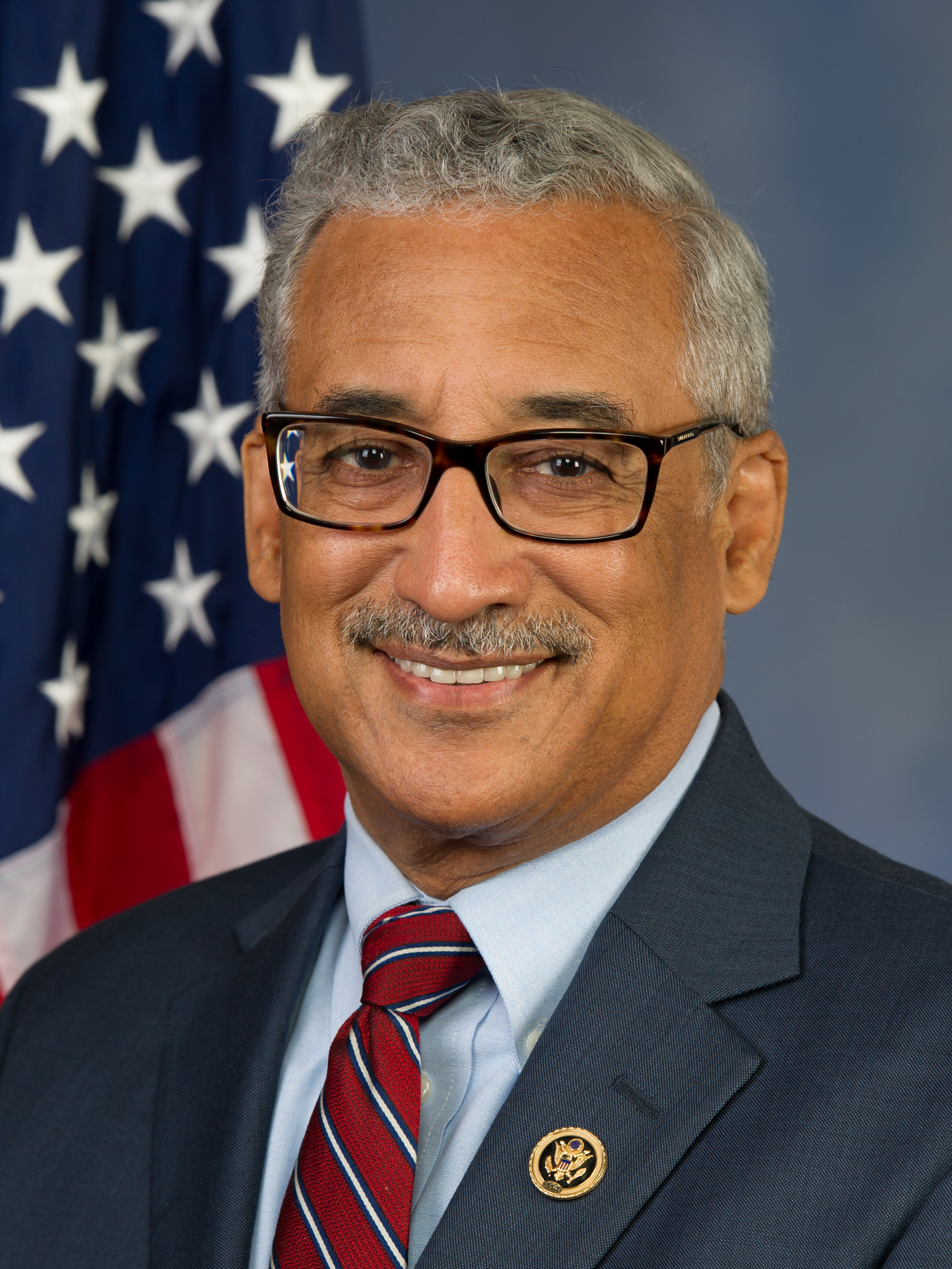

Nominee	Bobby Scott	Marty Williams
Party	Democratic	Republican
Popular vote	208,337	103,289
Percentage	66.7%	33.1%
- Scott: 50–60% 60–70% 70–80% 80–90% >90% Williams: 50–60% 60–70% 70–80% 80–90% Tie: 40–50%
U.S. Representative before election
Bobby Scott
Democratic
Elected U.S. Representative
Bobby Scott
Democratic

Democrat Bobby Scott had represented Virginia's 3rd congressional district since 1993. He was re-elected in 2014 with 94% of the vote, but the district was made slightly more competitive following the court-ordered redistricting when all of its Richmond and Petersburg constituents were moved into the 4th district.

=== Democratic primary ===
==== Candidates ====
===== Nominee =====
- Bobby Scott, incumbent U.S. Representative

=== Republican primary ===
==== Candidates ====
===== Nominee =====
- Marty Williams, former president of the Virginia State Fraternal Order of Police and chairman of the Chesapeake Planning Commission

=== General election ===
A debate was scheduled for October 25, but was canceled after the debate questions were leaked to both campaigns.

==== Predictions ====
Source	Ranking	As of
The Cook Political Report	Safe D	November 7, 2016
Daily Kos Elections	Safe D	November 7, 2016
Rothenberg	Safe D	November 3, 2016
Sabato's Crystal Ball	Safe D	November 7, 2016
RCP	Safe D	October 31, 2016

==== Endorsements ====
Bobby Scott (D)

Organizations

- Sierra Club

==== Results ====
Virginia's 3rd congressional district, 2016
Party	Candidate	Votes	%
Democratic	Bobby Scott (incumbent)	208,337	66.7
Republican	Marty Williams	103,289	33.1
Write-in		714	0.2
Total votes		312,340	100.0
Democratic hold			

== District 4 ==
2016 Virginia's 4th congressional district election
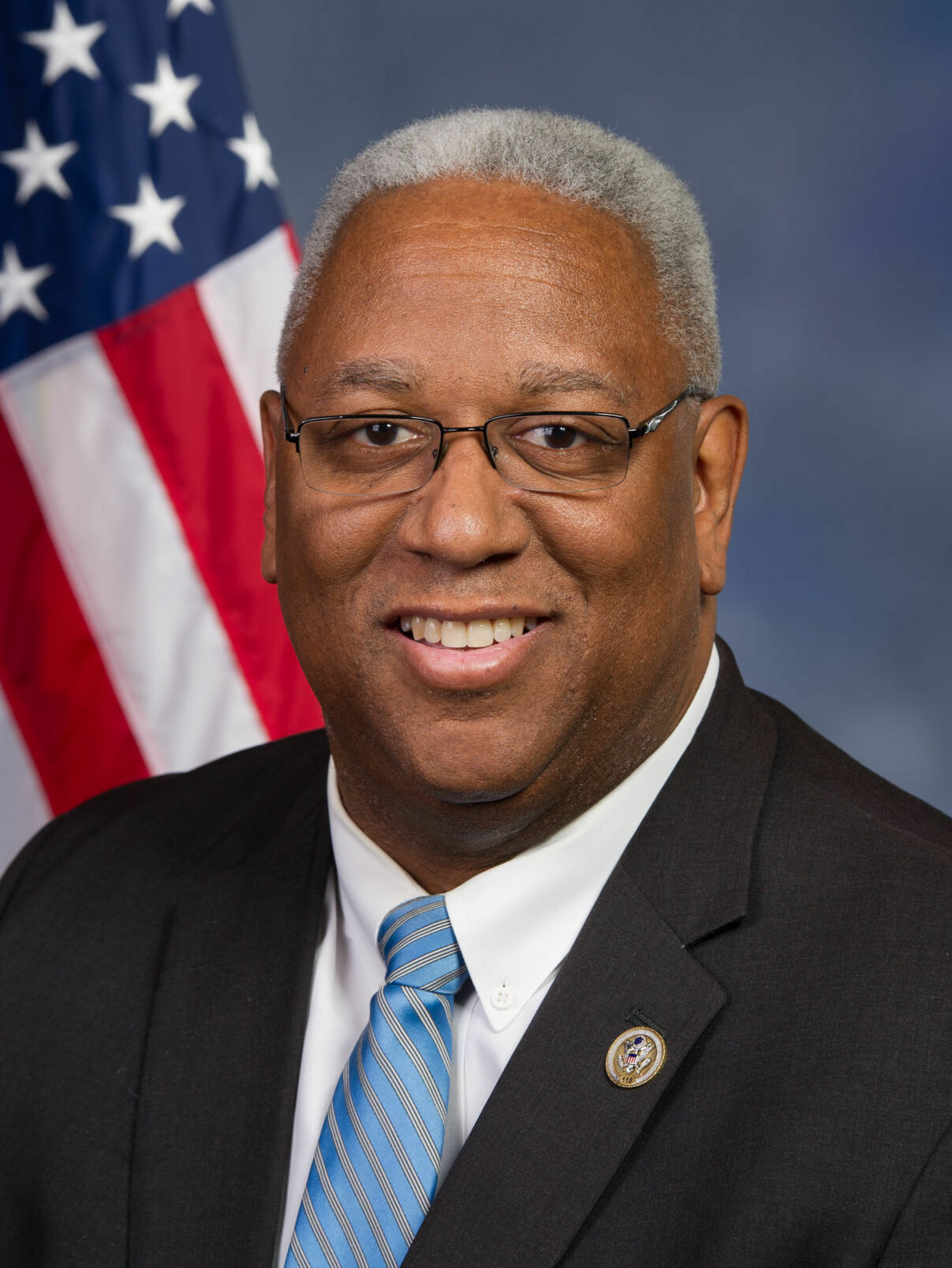

Nominee	Donald McEachin	Mike Wade
Party	Democratic	Republican
Popular vote	200,136	145,731
Percentage	57.7%	42.0%
- McEachin: 50–60% 60–70% 70–80% 80–90% >90% Wade: 40–50% 50–60% 60–70% 70–80% 80–90%
U.S. Representative before election
Randy Forbes
Republican
Elected U.S. Representative
Donald McEachin
Democratic

Republican Randy Forbes, first elected in 2001, was the incumbent of the 4th district, but attempted to seek re-election in the 2nd district. The 4th district was changed from a Hampton Roads centered district to a Richmond-centered district following the court's redistricting. Notably, it gained heavily Democratic, black-majority Richmond and Petersburg, which was enough to turn the district into a strongly Democratic district on paper. The old 4th had a PVI of R+4, while the new 4th had a PVI of D+10. The district was considered a Safe Gain for the Democrats by many political analysts, including Larry Sabato's Crystal Ball.

=== Republican primary ===
==== Candidates ====
===== Nominee =====
- Mike Wade, Henrico County Sheriff

===== Eliminated in primary =====
- Jackee Gonzalez

===== Declined =====
- Randy Forbes, incumbent U.S. Representative (running for VA-02)
- Suzy Kelly, Chesapeake City Councilwoman

==== Results ====
Republican primary results
Party	Candidate	Votes	%
Republican	Mike Wade	4,987	64.0
Republican	Jackee Gonzalez	2,801	36.0
Total votes		7,788	100.0

=== Democratic primary ===
==== Candidates ====
===== Nominee =====
- Donald McEachin, state senator and nominee for attorney general in 2001

===== Eliminated in primary =====
- Ella Ward, Chesapeake city councilwoman and nominee in 2012

===== Declined =====
- Lamont Bagby, state delegate
- Elliott Fausz, nominee in 2014
- Jennifer McClellan, state delegate
- Levar Stoney, Secretary of the Commonwealth of Virginia

==== Results ====
Democratic primary results
Party	Candidate	Votes	%
Democratic	Donald McEachin	11,851	75.4
Democratic	Ella Ward	3,867	24.6
Total votes		15,818	100.0

=== General election ===
==== Endorsements ====
Donald McEachin (D)

Organizations

- Sierra Club

==== Predictions ====
Source	Ranking	As of
The Cook Political Report	Likely D (flip)	November 7, 2016
Daily Kos Elections	Safe D (flip)	November 7, 2016
Rothenberg	Safe D (flip)	November 3, 2016
Sabato's Crystal Ball	Safe D (flip)	November 7, 2016
RCP	Likely D (flip)	October 31, 2016

==== Results ====
Virginia's 4th congressional district, 2016
Party	Candidate	Votes	%
Democratic	Donald McEachin	200,136	57.7
Republican	Mike Wade	145,731	42.1
Write-in		789	0.2
Total votes		346,656	100.0
Democratic gain from Republican			

== District 5 ==
2016 Virginia's 5th congressional district election
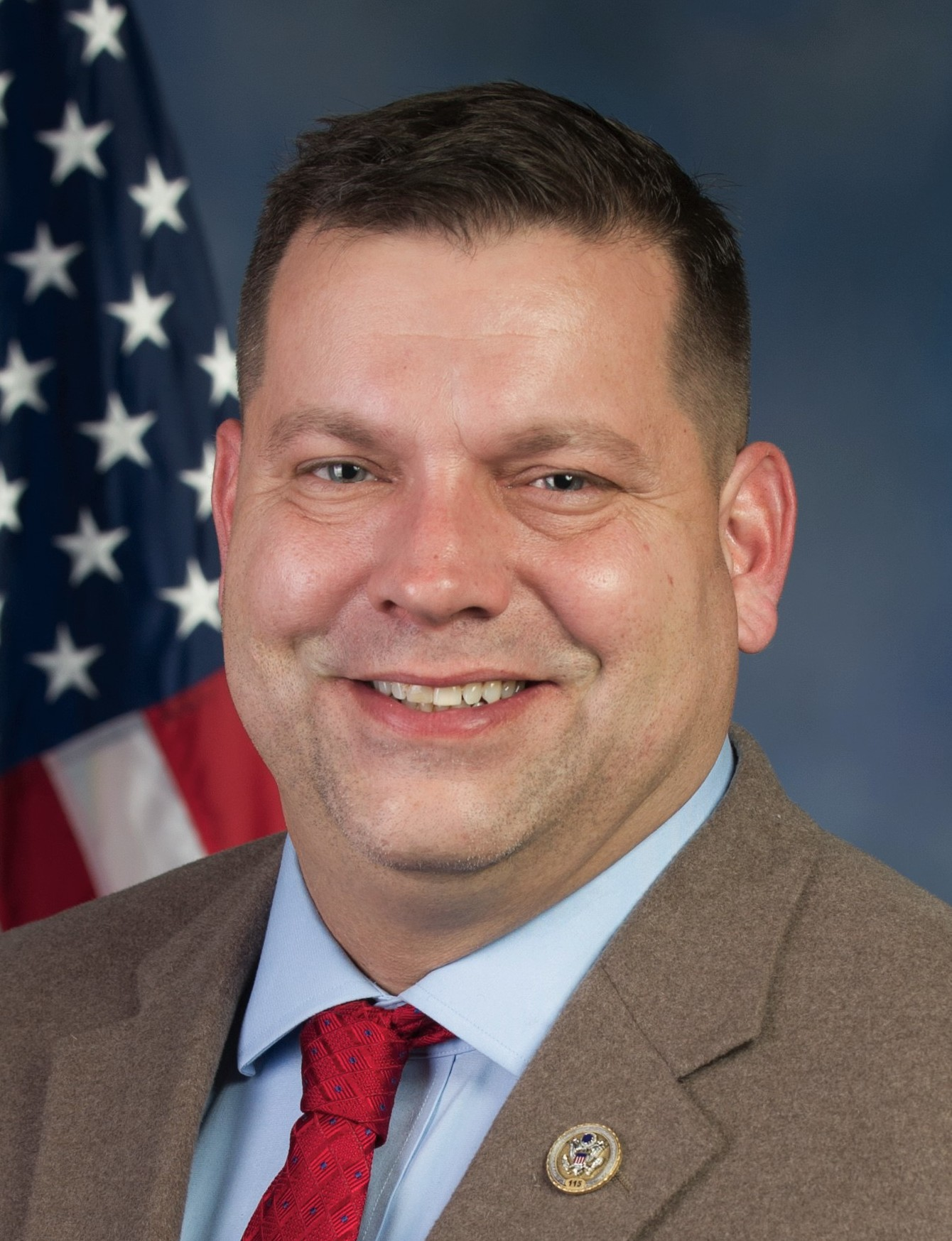

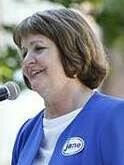
Candidate	Tom Garrett	Jane Dittmar
Party	Republican	Democratic
Popular vote	207,758	148,339
Percentage	58.2%	41.6%
- Garrett: 50–60% 60–70% 70–80% 80–90% Dittmar: 50–60% 60–70% 70–80% 80–90% >90%
U.S. Representative before election
Robert Hurt
Republican
Elected U.S. Representative
Tom Garrett
Republican

Incumbent Republican Robert Hurt, first elected in 2010, retired in 2016. The 5th district, which has a PVI of R+5, is the largest district in the state and stretches from Virginia's southern border to the exurbs of Washington, D.C.

=== Republican convention ===
The Republican party selected State Senator Tom Garrett as its nominee at a convention on May 14, with a filing deadline of March 31.

==== Candidates ====
===== Nominee =====
- Tom Garrett, state senator

===== Eliminated in primary =====
- Michael Del Rosso, technology executive
- Jim McKelvey, real estate developer, candidate in 2010 and state delegate candidate in 2013
- Joe Whited, congressional intelligence advisor

===== Withdrawn =====
- Andrew Griffin, former congressional staffer

=== Democratic convention ===
The Democratic party had scheduled a convention on May 7 to select a nominee. Jane Dittmar, the former chair of the Albemarle County Board of Supervisors, was the only candidate to file by the filing deadline and so was declared the Democratic nominee.

==== Candidates ====
===== Nominee =====
- Jane Dittmar, former chair of the Albemarle County Board of Supervisors (2014–15) and Supervisor for Scottsville Magisterial District (2013–15)

===== Withdrawn =====
- Ericke Cage, former congressional aide

===== Declined =====
- Ward Armstrong, former House Minority Leader
- Todd Haymore, Secretary of Agriculture and Forestry and former congressional aide

=== General election ===
==== Endorsements ====
Jane Dittmar (D)

Organizations

- EMILY's List
- Sierra Club

==== Predictions ====
Source	Ranking	As of
The Cook Political Report	Likely R	November 7, 2016
Daily Kos Elections	Likely R	November 7, 2016
Rothenberg	Likely R	November 3, 2016
Sabato's Crystal Ball	Lean R	November 7, 2016
RCP	Likely R	October 31, 2016

==== Results ====
Virginia's 5th congressional district, 2016
Party	Candidate	Votes	%
Republican	Tom Garrett	207,758	58.2
Democratic	Jane Dittmar	148,339	41.6
Write-in		659	0.2
Total votes		356,756	100.0
Republican hold			

== District 6 ==
2016 Virginia's 6th congressional district election
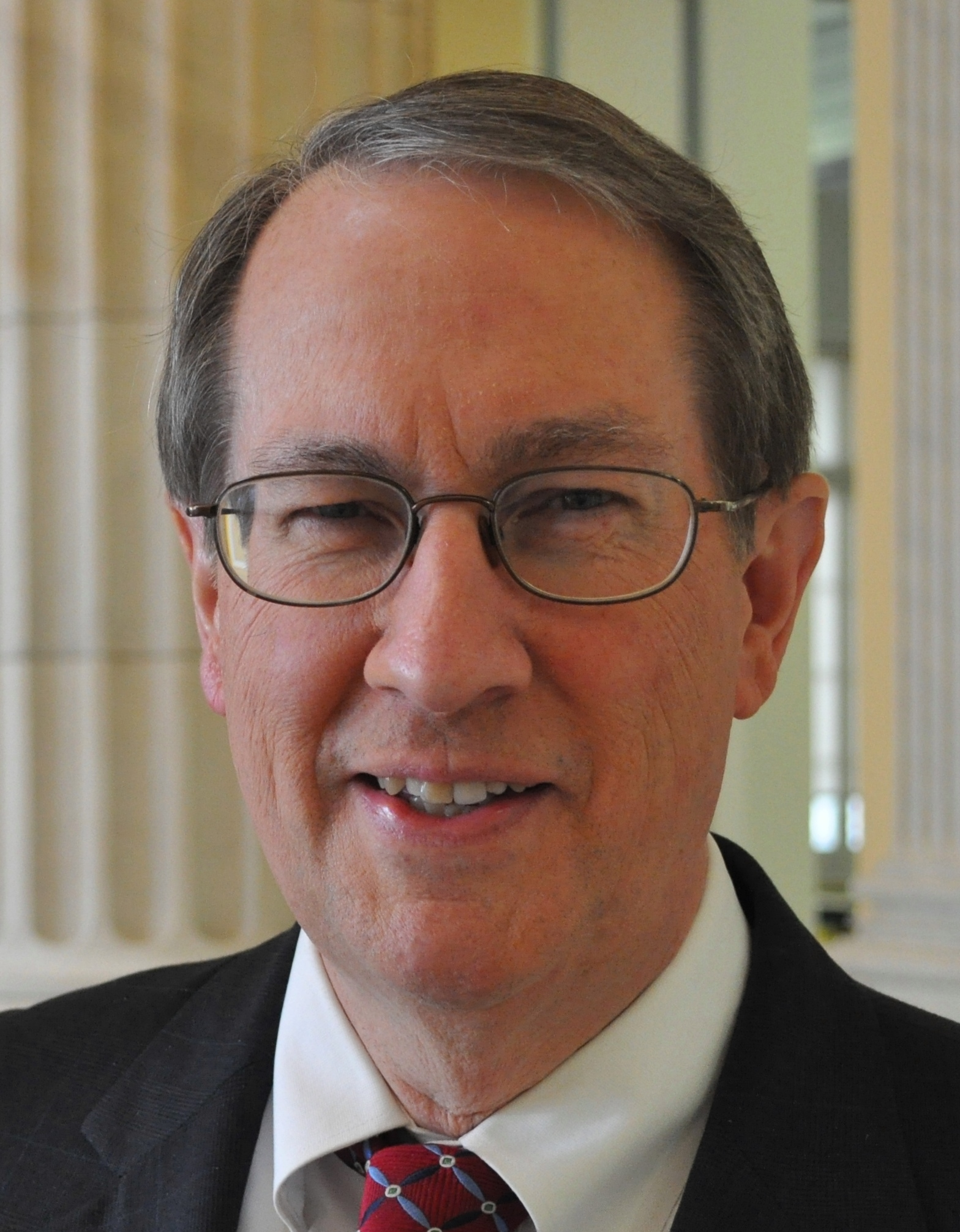

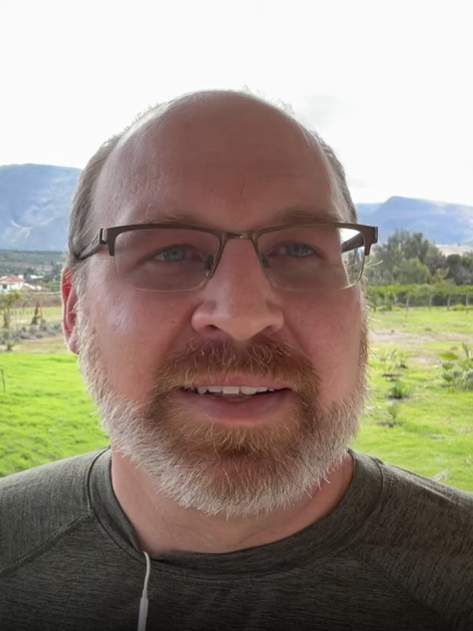
Nominee	Bob Goodlatte	Kai Degner
Party	Republican	Democratic
Popular vote	225,471	112,170
Percentage	66.6%	33.2%
- Goodlatte: 50–60% 60–70% 70–80% 80–90% >90% Degner: 50–60% 60–70% 70–80% 80–90%
U.S. Representative before election
Bob Goodlatte
Republican
Elected U.S. Representative
Bob Goodlatte
Republican

Republican Bob Goodlatte had represented Virginia's 6th congressional district since 1993. He was re-elected with 75% of the vote in 2014.

=== Republican primary ===
Harry Griego, a pilot and Air Force veteran who made a 2015 primary challenge of State Delegate Chris Head, challenged Goodlatte for the Republican nomination.

==== Candidates ====
===== Nominee =====
- Bob Goodlatte, incumbent U.S. Representative

===== Eliminated in primary =====
- Harry Griego, pilot and Air Force veteran

==== Primary results ====
Republican primary results
Party	Candidate	Votes	%
Republican	Bob Goodlatte (incumbent)	18,993	77.9
Republican	Harry Griego	5,383	22.1
Total votes		24,376	100.0

=== Democratic primary ===
In 2014, Democratic candidate Bruce Elder, a Staunton City Councilman, had to end his campaign after being diagnosed with cancer. Democrats did not field any candidates to challenge Goodlatte for that year's election.

No Democratic candidates announced in the early part of 2016, but Chris Hurst, a reporter for WDBJ in Roanoke who was the boyfriend of murdered reporter Alison Parker, had reportedly met with the Democratic Congressional Campaign Committee to discuss a potential campaign for this district. By late May, the only declared Democratic candidate was Warren County Democratic Party Chair Tom Howarth. However, citing health issues, Howarth withdrew. Kai Degner, a member of the Harrisonburg City Council and former mayor of the city, became the nominee by acclamation in early June.

==== Candidates ====
===== Nominee =====
- Kai Degner, former mayor of Harrisonburg

===== Withdrawn =====
- Tom Howarth, Warren County Democratic Party Chair

===== Declined =====
- Chris Hurst, reporter for WDBJ

=== General election ===
==== Predictions ====
Source	Ranking	As of
The Cook Political Report	Safe R	November 7, 2016
Daily Kos Elections	Safe R	November 7, 2016
Rothenberg	Safe R	November 3, 2016
Sabato's Crystal Ball	Safe R	November 7, 2016
RCP	Safe R	October 31, 2016

==== Results ====
Virginia's 6th congressional district, 2016
Party	Candidate	Votes	%
Republican	Bob Goodlatte (incumbent)	225,471	66.6
Democratic	Kai Degner	112,170	33.2
Write-in		768	0.2
Total votes		338,409	100.0
Republican hold			

== District 7 ==
2016 Virginia's 7th congressional district election
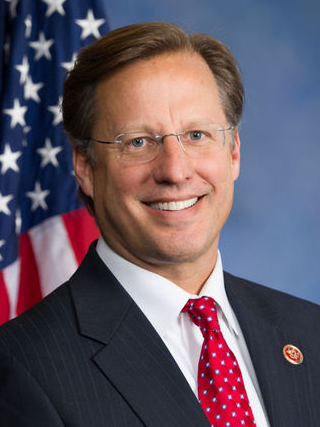

Nominee	Dave Brat	Eileen Bedell
Party	Republican	Democratic
Popular vote	218,057	160,159
Percentage	57.5%	42.2%
- Brat: 40–50% 50–60% 60–70% 70–80% 80–90% Bedell: 40–50% 50–60% 60–70% 70–80% 80–90% >90%
U.S. Representative before election
Dave Brat
Republican
Elected U.S. Representative
Dave Brat
Republican

Republican Dave Brat had represented Virginia's 7th congressional district since 2014. He was elected in 2014 with 61% of the vote.

=== Republican primary ===
==== Candidates ====
===== Nominee =====
- Dave Brat, incumbent U.S. Representative

===== Withdrawn =====
- Mike Wade, Henrico County Sheriff

=== Democratic primary ===
==== Candidates ====
===== Nominee =====
- Eileen Bedell, small business owner and attorney

=== General election ===
==== Endorsements ====
Eileen Bedell (D)

Organizations

- Sierra Club

==== Predictions ====
Source	Ranking	As of
The Cook Political Report	Safe R	November 7, 2016
Daily Kos Elections	Safe R	November 7, 2016
Rothenberg	Safe R	November 3, 2016
Sabato's Crystal Ball	Safe R	November 7, 2016
RCP	Likely R	October 31, 2016

==== Results ====
Virginia's 7th congressional district, 2016
Party	Candidate	Votes	%
Republican	David Brat (incumbent)	218,057	57.5
Democratic	Eileen Bedell	160,159	42.2
Write-in		947	0.3
Total votes		379,163	100.0
Republican hold			

== District 8 ==
2016 Virginia's 8th congressional district election
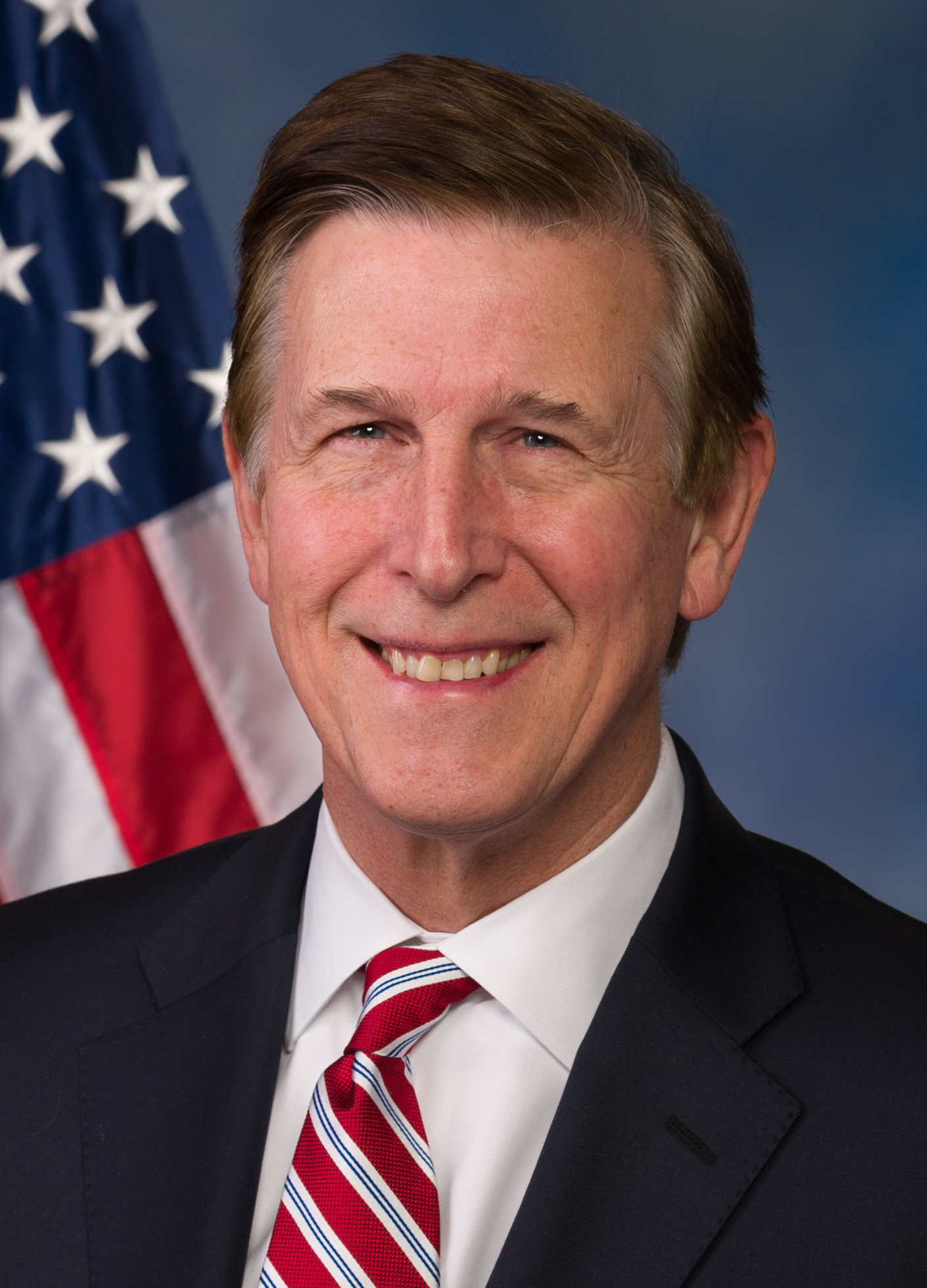

Nominee	Don Beyer	Charles Hernick
Party	Democratic	Republican
Popular vote	246,653	98,387
Percentage	68.4%	27.3%
- Beyer: 50–60% 60–70% 70–80% 80–90% Hernick: 50–60%
U.S. Representative before election
Don Beyer
Democratic
Elected U.S. Representative
Don Beyer
Democratic

Democrat Don Beyer had represented Virginia's 8th congressional district since 2015. He was elected in 2014 with 63% of the vote.

=== Republican convention ===
The Republican Party selected a nominee at a convention on May 7.

Two candidates sought the Republican nomination: Charles Hernick, an environmental consultant, and Mike Webb, a retired Army officer. Hernick defeated Webb to become the nominee.

==== Candidates ====
===== Nominee =====
- Charles Hernick, environmental consultant

===== Eliminated at the convention =====
- Mike Webb, retired Army officer

=== Other candidates ===
Independent candidate Julio Gracia also ran.

=== General election ===
==== Endorsements ====
Don Beyer (D)

Organizations

- Sierra Club

==== Predictions ====
Source	Ranking	As of
The Cook Political Report	Safe D	November 7, 2016
Daily Kos Elections	Safe D	November 7, 2016
Rothenberg	Safe D	November 3, 2016
Sabato's Crystal Ball	Safe D	November 7, 2016
RCP	Safe D	October 31, 2016

==== Results ====
Virginia's 8th congressional district, 2016
Party	Candidate	Votes	%
Democratic	Don Beyer (incumbent)	246,653	68.4
Republican	Charles Hernick	98,387	27.3
Independent	Julio Gracia	14,664	4.0
Write-in		972	0.3
Total votes		360,676	100.0
Democratic hold			

== District 9 ==
2016 Virginia's 9th congressional district election
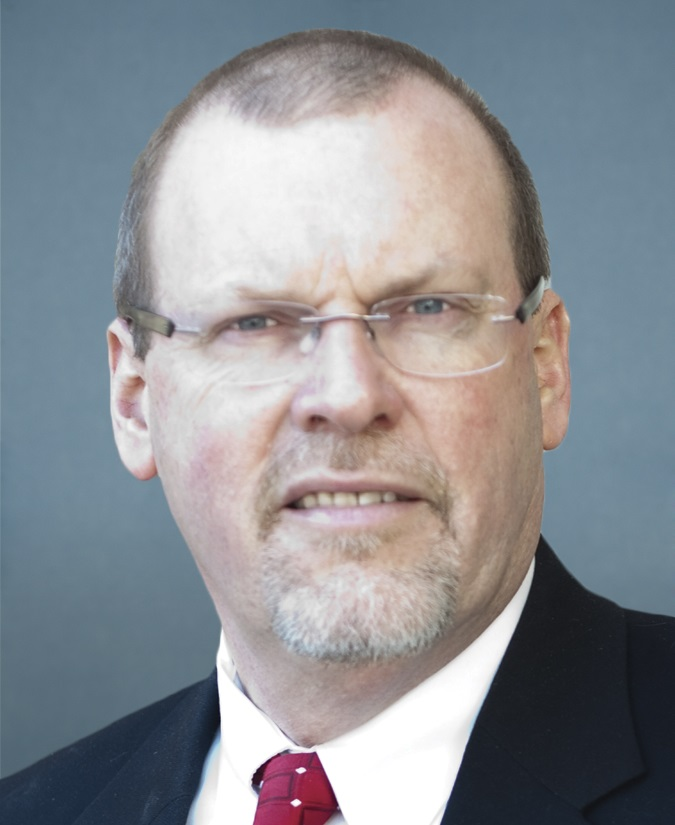

Nominee	Morgan Griffith	Derek Kitts
Party	Republican	Democratic
Popular vote	212,838	87,877
Percentage	68.6%	28.3%
- Griffith: 40–50% 50–60% 60–70% 70–80% 80–90% Kitts: 50–60% 60–70% 80–90% >90% Tie: 40–50%
U.S. Representative before election
Morgan Griffith
Republican
Elected U.S. Representative
Morgan Griffith
Republican

Republican Morgan Griffith represented Virginia's 9th congressional district since 2011. He won re-election to a third term in 2014 with 72% of the vote.

=== Republican primary ===
==== Candidates ====
===== Nominee =====
- Morgan Griffith, incumbent U.S. Representative

=== Democratic convention ===
The Democratic party selected retired Army veteran Derek Kitts as the nominee in a May 21 convention.

==== Candidates ====
===== Nominee =====
- Derek Kitts, retired Army veteran

===== Eliminated at the convention =====
- Bill Bunch, farmer and retired postal worker

===== Declined =====
- David Bowers, Mayor of Roanoke

=== Other candidates ===
Independent candidate Janice Boyd also ran.

=== General election ===
==== Predictions ====
Source	Ranking	As of
The Cook Political Report	Safe R	November 7, 2016
Daily Kos Elections	Safe R	November 7, 2016
Rothenberg	Safe R	November 3, 2016
Sabato's Crystal Ball	Safe R	November 7, 2016
RCP	Safe R	October 31, 2016

==== Results ====
Virginia's 9th congressional district, 2016
Party	Candidate	Votes	%
Republican	Morgan Griffith (incumbent)	212,838	68.6
Democratic	Derek Kitts	87,877	28.3
Independent	Janice Boyd	9,050	2.9
Write-in		549	0.2
Total votes		310,314	100.0
Republican hold			

== District 10 ==
2016 Virginia's 10th congressional district election
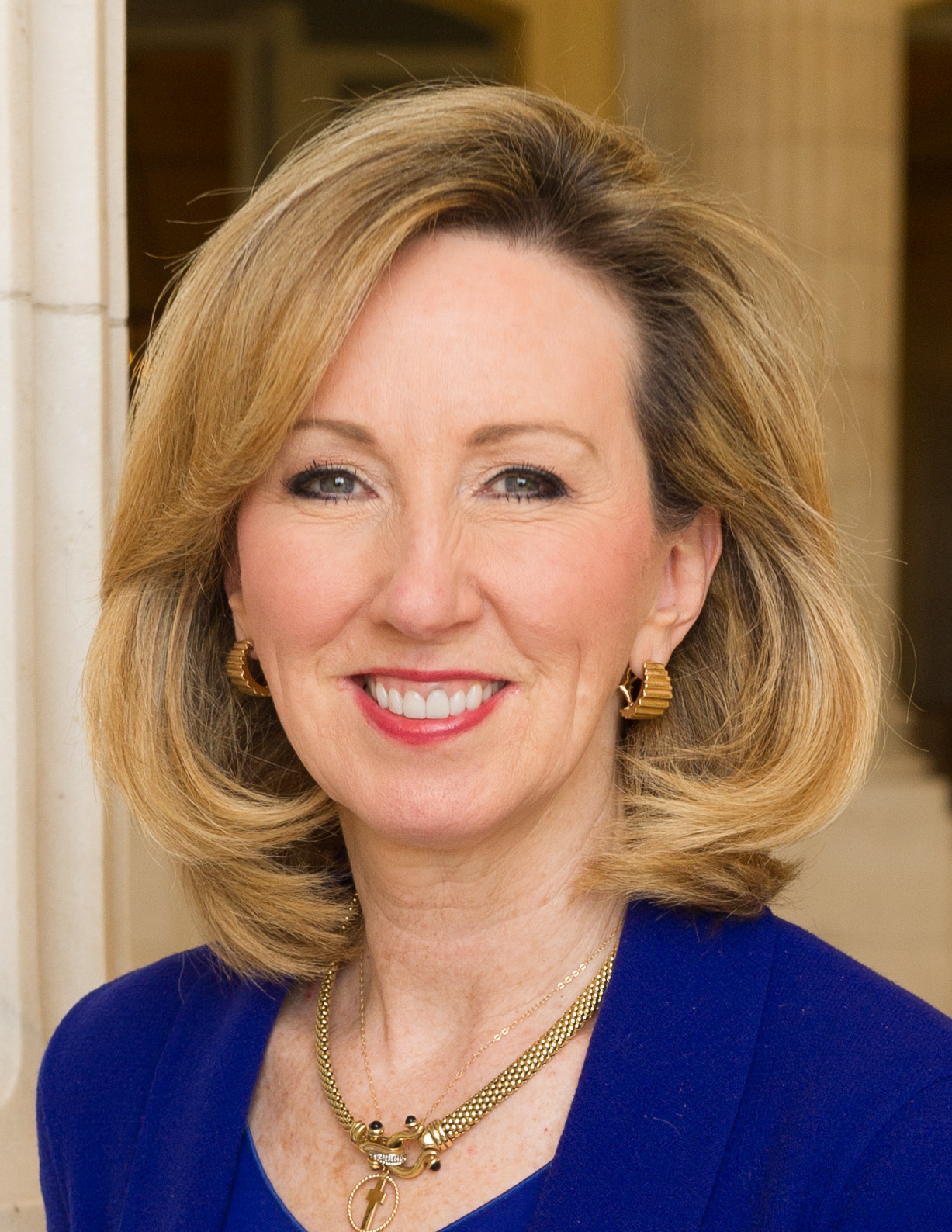

Candidate	Barbara Comstock	LuAnn Bennett
Party	Republican	Democratic
Popular vote	210,791	187,712
Percentage	52.7%	46.9%
- Comstock: 40–50% 50–60% 60–70% 70–80% 80–90% Bennett: 40–50% 50–60% 60–70% 70–80% Tie: 40–50%
U.S. Representative before election
Barbara Comstock
Republican
Elected U.S. Representative
Barbara Comstock
Republican

Republican Barbara Comstock was the incumbent in the 10th district. In 2015, she succeeded Republican Frank Wolf, who served for 17 terms before choosing to not seek re-election 2014. The 10th district, which has a PVI of D+1, consists of the northernmost portions of the state. Comstock ran for re-election.

=== Republican primary ===
==== Candidates ====
===== Nominee =====
- Barbara Comstock, incumbent U.S. Representative

=== Democratic primary ===
==== Candidates ====
===== Nominee =====
- LuAnn Bennett, real estate executive and ex-wife of former 8th District Congressman Jim Moran

=== Other candidates ===
Libertarian candidate JD Thorpe ran as a write-in candidate.

=== General election ===
==== Campaign ====
Due to the competitiveness of the district and the ability of both candidates to raise large amounts of money, the race was expected to be one of the most heavily contested in the country. Democratic strategist Ellen Qualls said the 10th District is "essentially the swingiest district in the swingiest state."

In the first three weeks of her campaign, Bennett raised $281,000, while Comstock raised $2 million overall since January 2015.

==== Endorsements ====
LuAnn Bennett (D)

Organizations

- EMILY's List
- Sierra Club

==== Predictions ====
Source	Ranking	As of
The Cook Political Report	Tossup	November 7, 2016
Daily Kos Elections	Tossup	November 7, 2016
Rothenberg	Tilt R	November 3, 2016
Sabato's Crystal Ball	Lean R	November 7, 2016
RCP	Tossup	October 31, 2016

==== Results ====
Virginia's 10th congressional district, 2016
Party	Candidate	Votes	%
Republican	Barbara Comstock (incumbent)	210,791	52.7
Democratic	LuAnn Bennett	187,712	46.9
Write-in		1,580	0.4
Total votes		400,083	100.0
Republican hold			

Comstock was re-elected even though her district voted for Clinton by 10 percentage points in the presidential race.

== District 11 ==
2016 Virginia's 11th congressional district election
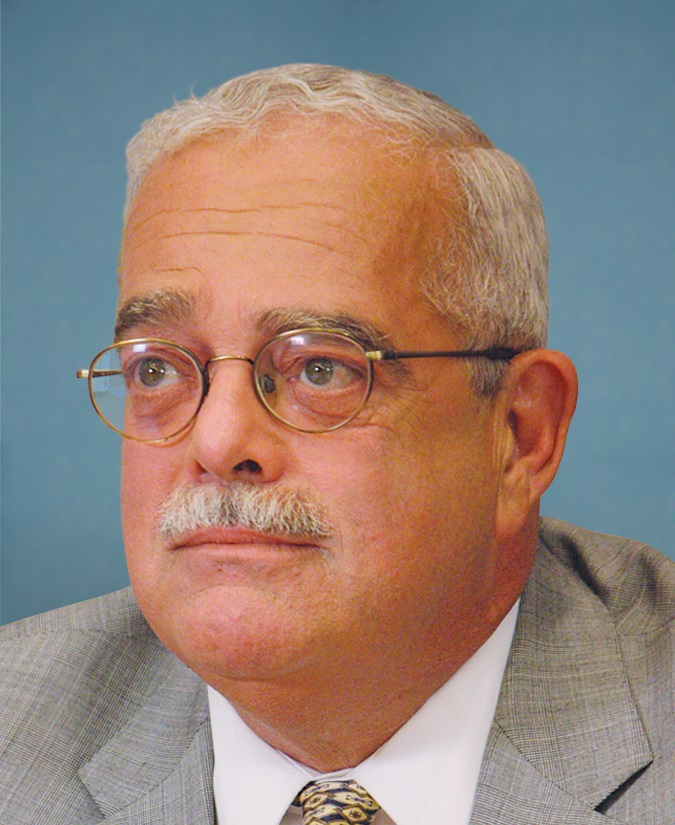
Nominee	Gerry Connolly
Party	Democratic
Popular vote	247,818
Percentage	87.9%
- Connolly: 70–80% 80–90% >90% No votes
U.S. Representative before election
Gerry Connolly
Democratic
Elected U.S. Representative
Gerry Connolly
Democratic

Democrat Gerry Connolly had represented Virginia's 11th congressional district since 2009. He was re-elected in 2014 with 57% of the vote. He was the only candidate on the ballot for the seat in 2016.

=== Democratic primary ===
==== Candidates ====
===== Nominee =====
- Gerry Connolly, incumbent U.S. Representative

=== Republican convention ===
One person, John Wolfe, filed for the Republican nomination, which was to be decided at a convention on May 14, 2016. However, Wolfe did not campaign or even attend the convention, so the convention delegates rejected his nomination by a 3-to-1 margin. The 11th District Republican Committee searched for a new candidate, but ultimately decided no viable candidate was available and opted to focus on the presidential race and on defeating the Fairfax County meals tax referendum.

=== Libertarian nomination ===
One person, Daniel Mittereder, filed for the Libertarian nomination and was accepted. However, he suffered a severe strep throat infection shortly afterward which required a tonsillectomy and was forced to withdraw his candidacy.

=== General election ===
==== Endorsements ====
Gerry Connolly (D)

Organizations

- Sierra Club

==== Predictions ====
Source	Ranking	As of
The Cook Political Report	Safe D	November 7, 2016
Daily Kos Elections	Safe D	November 7, 2016
Rothenberg	Safe D	November 3, 2016
Sabato's Crystal Ball	Safe D	November 7, 2016
RCP	Safe D	October 31, 2016

==== Results ====
Virginia's 11th congressional district, 2016
Party	Candidate	Votes	%
Democratic	Gerry Connolly (incumbent)	247,818	87.9
Write-in		34,185	12.1
Total votes		282,003	100.0
Democratic hold			
