= Richard S. Reynolds III =

American businessman, philanthropist, and politician (1934–2023)

Member of the Virginia House of Delegates from the 33rd district
- In office January 14, 1976 – January 11, 1978 Serving with George E. Allen Jr., Frank Hall, Eleanor P. Sheppard, and Edward E. Lane
- Preceded by: Philip B. Morris
- Succeeded by: Benjamin Lambert

Personal details
- Born: Richard Samuel Reynolds III; August 8, 1934 New York City, U.S.
- Died: September 18, 2023 (aged 89) Richmond, Virginia, U.S.
- Resting place: Reynolds Homestead
- Party: Democratic
- Spouse: Pamela Coe
- Parent: R. S. Reynolds Jr. (father)
- Relatives: J. Sargeant Reynolds (brother)
- Education: Princeton University (BA)
- Occupation: Businessman; politician

Richard Samuel "Major" Reynolds III (August 8, 1934 – September 18, 2023) was an American businessman, philanthropist, and Democratic Party politician. He was a son of Richard S. Reynolds Jr. and grandson of Richard S. Reynolds Sr., founder of Reynolds Metals Company. His younger brother, J. Sargeant Reynolds, served a term in the Virginia House of Delegates and a partial term in the Virginia Senate before being elected as the state's lieutenant governor. Four years after his brother's death in office from an inoperable brain tumor, Reynolds was elected to the state house himself, where he served a term representing the Richmond, Virginia-based 33rd district. Rather than seeking reelection in 1977, he instead campaigned for his party's nomination in that year's lieutenant gubernatorial election. Facing lawyer Chuck Robb (the son-in-law of the late former president Lyndon B. Johnson) and fellow-delegate Ira M. Lechner in the party primary, he placed second behind Robb, who went on to defeat Republican nominee A. Joe Canada Jr. in the November general election. Later in life, he was a major fundraiser for the Virginia Civil Rights Memorial.
