= A. Joe Canada Jr. =

American politician

Joe Canada
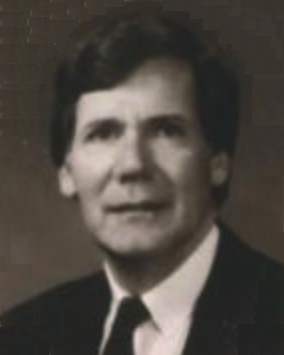

Member of the Virginia Senate from the 8th district
- In office January 12, 1972 – January 13, 1988
- Preceded by: Robert C. Fitzgerald
- Succeeded by: Sonny Stallings

Personal details
- Born: Andrew Joseph Canada Jr. May 8, 1939 (age 87) Lynchburg, Virginia, U.S.
- Party: Republican
- Spouse: Alexandra Campbell
- Education: Hampden-Sydney College; University of Richmond

Andrew Joseph "A. Joe" Canada Jr. (born May 8, 1939) is an American attorney, former state judge and Republican Party politician who served sixteen years in the Virginia Senate (1972–1988) and then as Circuit Judge in Virginia Beach (1996–2009).

== Education and family life ==
Raised in Lynchburg, Virginia, Canada lost his father when he was a boy, and his mother died when he was a teenager. He worked in a local paper mill, and helped finance his education at Hampden-Sydney College as Massive Resistance continued by making sandwiches in the dormitories as well as repairing cars, graduating in 1962.

Attending law school at the T.C. Williams Law School of the University of Richmond, Canada graduated in 1965. He married Alexandra Campbell, and had at least one son, Joshua.

Active in his Episcopal Church, Canada also at times served as president of the Linkhorn Park Elementary School PTA and the Princess Anne Lions Club, chairman of St. Jude Hospital Fund raising, and as the secretary of the Virginia Beach Jaycees. He was also active in the Masons and Virginia Beach Boys Club.

== Career ==
Admitted to the Virginia bar in 1965, Canada's first legal job was as an assistant prosecutor in Virginia Beach. After two years, he set up a private legal practice and was active in the Virginia and Virginia Beach Bar Associations. He also operated a 130-acre farm near Smith Mountain Lake southwest of Lynchburg.

Active in the local Republican Party, Canada won his first political office in 1971, representing the new 8th senatorial district. Virginia Beach had previously been amalgamated with Chesapeake and Portsmouth as the 3rd senatorial district, which had three senators, all Democrats: William H. Hodges, Willard J. Moody and Edward T. Caton III. The single-member districts were required by court decisions following Davis v. Mann, which enunciated the one man-one vote rule for legislative districts. Canada won re-election to the part-time position three times while continuing his legal practice.

However, Canada failed in his attempts to win other offices. In 1977, Democrat (and future U.S. Senator) Charles Robb defeated Canada to become Lieutenant Governor of Virginia. In 1986, Canada ran to represent Virginia's 2nd congressional district, but lost to Democrat Owen B. Pickett.

On November 3, 1987, Canada lost his re-election bid to fellow attorney but Democrat Sonny Stallings, who four years later would be defeated by a former police officer and Republican whom Canada had mentored, Ken Stolle. Meanwhile, Canada continued his criminal defense practice.

In 1996, with the support of Virginia Beach lawyer and Democratic delegate Glenn R. Croshaw, the Virginia General Assembly elected Canada as a circuit judge for Virginia Beach, and he served until reaching the mandatory retirement age in 2009. Until at least 2019, Canada also served on the Virginia Senate's ethics panel.
