= 1977 Virginia lieutenant gubernatorial election =

- November 8, 1977
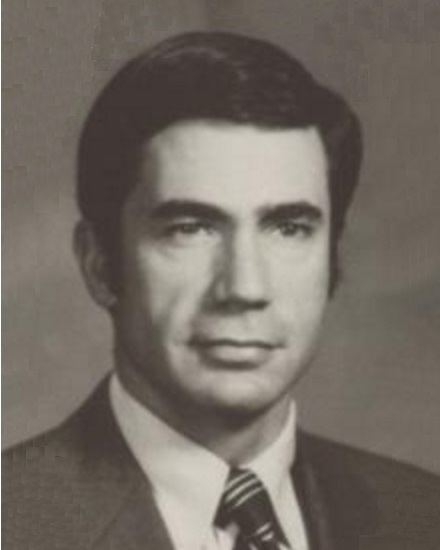

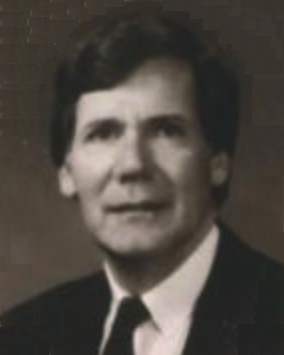
Nominee	Chuck Robb	A. Joe Canada Jr.
Party	Democratic	Republican
Popular vote	652,084	550,116
Percentage	54.24%	45.76%
- County and independent city results Robb: 50–60% 60–70% 70–80% Canada: 50–60% 60–70%
Lieutenant Governor before election
John N. Dalton
Republican
Elected Lieutenant Governor
Chuck Robb
Democratic

The 1977 Virginia lieutenant gubernatorial election was held on November 8, 1977. Democratic nominee Chuck Robb defeated Republican nominee A. Joe Canada Jr. with 54.24% of the vote.

== Primary elections ==
Primary elections were held on June 14, 1977.

=== Democratic primary ===
==== Candidates ====
- Chuck Robb, attorney and son-in-law of former President Lyndon B. Johnson
- Richard S. "Major" Reynolds III
- Ira M. Lechner, attorney

==== Results ====
Democratic primary results
Party	Candidate	Votes	%
Democratic	Chuck Robb	184,887	39.04
Democratic	Major Reynolds	156,151	32.97
Democratic	Ira M. Lechner	132,520	27.98
Total votes		473,558	100.00

== General election ==
=== Candidates ===
- Chuck Robb, Democratic
- A. Joe Canada Jr., Republican

=== Results ===
1977 Virginia lieutenant gubernatorial election
Party	Candidate	Votes	%	±%
Democratic	Chuck Robb	652,084	54.24%	
Republican	A. Joe Canada Jr.	550,116	45.76%	
Majority		101,968		
Turnout				
Democratic gain from Republican		Swing		
