= Senator Stallings =

Senator Stallings may refer to:

- Henry Stallings II (1950–2015), Michigan State Senate
- Sonny Stallings (born 1947), Virginia State Senate
