= Harry R. Purkey =

American politician (1934–2018)

Member of the Virginia House of Delegates from the 82nd district
- In office January 8, 1986 – January 8, 2014
- Preceded by: Buster O'Brien
- Succeeded by: Bill DeSteph

Personal details
- Born: Harry Robert Purkey; July 13, 1934 Parsons, West Virginia, U.S.
- Died: February 16, 2018 (aged 83) Virginia Beach, Virginia, U.S.
- Party: Republican
- Spouse: Sonja Helene Firing
- Education: Old Dominion University
- Occupation: Stockbroker

Military service
- Allegiance: United States
- Branch/service: United States Army
- Years of service: 1957–1962
- Unit: U.S. Army Reserve

Harry Robert "Bob" Purkey (July 13, 1934 – February 16, 2018) was an American politician. Starting in 1986, he was a Republican member of the Virginia House of Delegates, representing the 82nd district in Virginia Beach.

Purkey announced that he would not run for reelection in 2013.
