= Sonny Stallings =

American attorney and politician (born 1947)

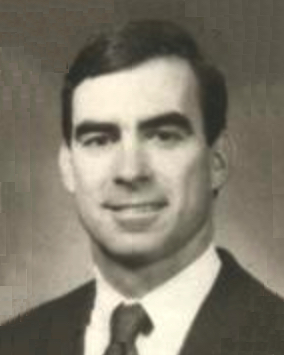
- Official portrait, 1988

Member of the Virginia Senate from the 8th district
- In office January 13, 1988 – January 8, 1992
- Preceded by: Joe Canada
- Succeeded by: Ken Stolle

Personal details
- Born: Moody Eason Stallings Jr. December 12, 1947 (age 78) Suffolk, Virginia, U.S.
- Party: Democratic
- Spouse: Joan
- Education: Old Dominion University (BA); University of Richmond (JD)
- Occupation: Lawyer; politician

Military service
- Branch/service: United States Marine Corps
- Battles/wars: Vietnam War
- Awards: Purple Heart

Moody Eason "Sonny" Stallings Jr. (born December 12, 1947) is an American attorney and former politician, who served as a member of the Virginia Senate. He was first elected in 1987, defeating incumbent A. Joe Canada Jr., but lost reelection in 1991 to Ken Stolle.

Stallings was wounded in action during the Vietnam War.

== Electoral history ==
Date	Election	Candidate	Party	Votes	%
Virginia Senate, 8th district
Nov 3, 1987	General	Moody E. Stallings Jr.	Democratic	16,409	48.41
Nov 3, 1987	General	A. Joe Canada Jr.	Republican	15,881	46.85
Nov 3, 1987	General	Louis Miles Pace	Independent	1,589	4.69
Nov 3, 1987	General	Write Ins		20	0.05
Nov 5, 1991	General	Kenneth W. Stolle	Republican	13,202	54.02
Nov 5, 1991	General	Moody E. Stallings Jr.	Democratic	11,194	45.80
Nov 5, 1991	General	Write Ins		45	0.18
