= Elise B. Heinz =

American lawyer and politician (1935–2014)

Member of the Virginia House of Delegates from Arlington and Alexandria
- In office January 11, 1978 – January 12, 1982
- Preceded by: Ira M. Lechner
- Succeeded by: [Seat eliminated in redistricting]

Personal details
- Born: January 14, 1935 Plainfield, New Jersey
- Died: January 19, 2014 (aged 79) Arlington, Virginia
- Party: Democratic
- Spouse: James E. Clayton
- Children: 2
- Education: Wellesley College, Harvard Law School

Elise Brookfield Heinz (January 14, 1935 – January 19, 2014) was an American lawyer and politician. She was a member of the Virginia House of Delegates from 1978 to 1981, representing the 23rd district as a Democrat.

== Early life and education ==
Heinz was born on January 14, 1935, in Plainfield, New Jersey, and grew up in Alexandria, Virginia. She graduated from Wellesley College with a BA in 1955 and received a J.D. from Harvard Law School in 1961. In her second and third year at Harvard she was the only female editor of the Harvard Law Review.

== Career ==
Heinz was challenged to find employment merited by her achievement at Harvard. Heinz clerked for U.S. Judge David Bazelon, worked as a lawyer in private practice, and handled cases pro bono for the American Civil Liberties Union and the Women's Legal Defense Fund. Heinz became known for campaigning for the Equal Rights Amendment (ERA) and as of 1973, helped lead the National Organization for Women in Virginia. In 1974, Heinz represented John Patler in the unsuccessful appeal of his conviction for the murder of George Lincoln Rockwell, founder of the American Nazi Party. As of 1975, she ran ERA-Central, a pro-ERA organization.

Heinz won election to the Virginia House of Delegates in 1977, and won re-election once, but her district consisting Arlington and Alexandria was eliminated in the 1981 redistricting. The only Harvard-trained lawyer in the House of Delegates, Heinz’s warned that the new map was unconstitutional. On August 25, 1981, a federal court ruled in Cosner v. Dalton that the map was unconstitutional, but allowed the 1981 election to proceed. Heinz lost to the three other Arlington incumbent Democrats in September’s primary.

Heinz died on January 19, 2014, in Arlington, Virginia.
