= Jeff McWaters =

American businessman and politician (born 1956)

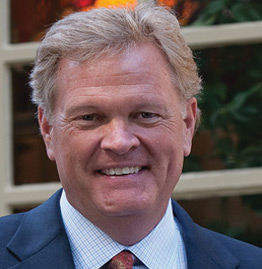
- McWaters in 2008

Member of the Virginia Senate from the 8th district
- In office January 13, 2010 – January 13, 2016
- Preceded by: Ken Stolle
- Succeeded by: Bill DeSteph

Personal details
- Born: Jeffrey Linde McWaters; September 6, 1956 (age 70) Paducah, Kentucky, U.S.
- Party: Republican
- Spouse: Cynthia
- Education: University of Kentucky (BS)

Jeffrey Linde "Jeff" McWaters (born September 6, 1956) is an American businessman and former member of the Senate of Virginia as a Republican. He represented the 8th district, which includes a portion of Virginia Beach. He was first elected in a special election in January 2010, and re-elected the following year. He left office after the 2015 elections, serving six years.

McWaters is the founder and former CEO of Amerigroup, a managed health care organization launched out of Virginia Beach.

== Early life ==
Jeff's father, Joe McWaters worked as a plant superintendent in a car radiator plant, and his mother Patsy McWaters worked as a school teacher and medical office manager. McWaters attended Paducah Tilghman High School and continued on to Paducah Community College before he enrolled at the University of Kentucky, where he pursued a degree in accounting. He joined the Kentucky Wildcats football team as a walk-on, but a knee injury prevented him from playing.

Jeff met his wife Cindy when they both attended Paducah Tilghman High School. They married in 1981.

Jeff and Cindy McWaters moved to Virginia Beach where he started Amerigroup, which would become one of the nation's largest healthcare organizations, with revenues exceeding $6 billion (as of 2011).

Jeff McWaters was inducted into the University of Kentucky's Gatton College of Business and Economics Hall of Fame in 2003.

== Business career ==
=== Ernst & Young ===
In the Spring of 1979, McWaters graduated with a B.S. in accounting from the University of Kentucky, and accepted a job at Ernst & Young Nashville.

=== CIGNA ===
In 1980, he joined CIGNA subsidiary 'Hospital Affiliates International', a company that acquired managed care health plans. He opened the first Dallas, Texas office for CIGNA Health Plans.

=== Options Mental Health ===
In 1986, Jeff McWaters co-founded the Norfolk-based company Options Mental Health. Options Mental Health customized plans and programs for mental health and substance abuse recovery for National Employers, State Government, and Tricare

=== Amerigroup Corporation ===
Jeff McWaters started Americaid Community Care (Amerigroup) in 1994 in Virginia Beach. The company focused on meeting the healthcare needs of low-income families and individuals who relied on pre-existing state programs such as Medicaid and the Children's Health Insurance Program. Americaid Community Care focused on disease management programs for diseases and conditions such as prenatal care, asthma, diabetes, and sickle cell anemia. San Francisco-based venture capital firm, Acacia Venture Partners, lead the initial funding of the company, closely followed by co-investors Sutter Hill Ventures and New Enterprise Associates (NEA). The first operations of Americaid Community Care took place in New Jersey in 1996, quickly followed by Illinois and Texas. As Americaid Community Care launched a family of related products and gained a wider membership base, McWaters decided to give the company a more inclusive name, which resulted in the launch of Amerigroup Corporation in 1996.

==== Starting out ====
Amerigroup membership exceeded 100,000 in 1998. New Jersey membership increased as a result of Amerigroup's first acquisition; the Medicaid business from Oxford Health Plans. This was the first of about 14 future acquisitions Amerigroup would make. Following the purchase of Oxford Health Plan's Medicaid business, Amerigroup turned its first profit of about $3.5 million. In 1999, Amerigroup acquired Prudential HealthCare's Medicaid business, and in July of the same year opened an additional location in Dallas, where 34,000 members were added. Memberships reached 268,000 by the end of 1999, and the company more than doubled in size the following years.

==== Initial public offering and development of new programs ====
In 2000, Amerigroup launched a range of new programs, including Amerikids in Dallas and Houston, as well as Ameriplus in New Jersey. In the same year Amerigroup saw memberships increase across its programs, resulting in a total revenue of $646.4 million and a net income of $26 million.

In the spring of 2000, Amerigroup filed for an initial public offering (IPO) with Deutsche Banc Alex Brown as lead underwriter. However, the stock market began to see declines and IPOs proved difficult to execute. In the summer of 2001, with Banc of America Securities and UBS Warburg as the new underwriters, a September date was set for the public offering to take place. Amerigroup's management was scheduled to be in New York's World Trade Center on September 10 and 11. However, by request from Bank of America, the IPO was moved to San Francisco for the morning of September 11, 2001. Following the September 11 attacks, Amerigroup discontinued the Public Offering, and stayed in registration for over a year. The IPO was complete on November 6, 2001, after submitting ten amendments since 2000. Amerigroup debuted on November 6, 2001, with 4.4 million shares of common stock (NASDAQ: AMGP) According to an article from Investor's Business Daily, "The shares were priced at $17, within the expected range of $17 to $19 Amerigroup jumped as high as $22.55 before closing up $3.90 at $20.90, a 23% gain."

Amerigroup netted $68.7 million from the IPO, most of which was earmarked for general corporate needs as well as further acquisitions. Amerigroup acquired MethodistCare Inc. in Houston, Texas, which resulted in another 18,000 members. By the end of 2001 the company had a membership base of 472,000, 150,000 of those memberships being brought on directly from acquisitions. At the year-end, premiums reached $889.5 million and net revenue had grown by 31% from the previous year.

Amerigroup added another 6,000 members through the acquisition of the D.C Medicaid business of Capital Community Health. Continuing in the year of 2002, the company saw significant growth in various markets – this included 7,000 new memberships in Maryland, 11,000 in New Jersey, 20,000 in Dallas, 23,000 in Fort Worth, and 39,000 in Houston. Amerigroup saw an overall growth with nearly 600,000 members, premiums exceeding 1 billion, and a net income of $47 million.

In 2003, Amerigroup moved from NASDAQ to the New York Stock Exchange (NYSE) followed by a second offering of stock. Amerigroup continued to expand through the purchase of Physicians Healthcare Plans, adding an additional 190,000 members in Florida. As a result of the acquisitions, Amerigroup expanded into the Tampa, Orlando, and Miami/ Fort Lauderdale markets. Right before 2003 year-end, Amerigroup acquired St. Augustine Medicaid, resulting in an added membership base of 28,000. The company saw growth beyond the Florida market with 47,000 members acquired from its other markets. 2003 year-end results showed premiums topping $1.6 billion with a net income of $67.3 million. In 2004, Amerigroup entered the New York City market with plans to acquire CarePlus Health Plan. The $125 million purchase would open doors to about 1.3 million people eligible for Medicaid. Amerigroup reached a point of memberships beyond the million mark.

==== Lawsuits and challenges ====
In July 2005, Amerigroup's annual revenue had grown to $1.8 billion with a stock price of $46.92 per share. In September 2005, Amerigroup missed the analysts' estimated earnings for the second quarter, meaning they would fall short in the third quarter and have to report a loss of $2.3 million as opposed to a profit of $24.7 million. The Medicaid managed-care market in Fort Worth, Texas had slowly diminished to Amerigroup and one other competitor. When the competitor's plan failed, Amerigroup took on its remaining members at the state's request. The patients in question needed more care than Amerigroup had expected, and the company had updated its computer processing systems which resulted in expenses hitting the books earlier than anticipated.

On September 28, 2005, Amerigroup announced its loss, and by October 27, the company's stock price had dropped to $15.45 per share. The company performed better in the fourth quarter of 2005, but it took several months for Amerigroup to fully recover.

In 2007, Amerigroup settled a lawsuit brought on by shareholders who claimed to have been defrauded following the company's drop in share price as a result of the money lost in the third quarter of 2005. Amerigroup paid $5 million in settlements.

Amerigroup became subject to a second lawsuit led by an ex-employee along with the state of Illinois and the Federal Government. The False Claims Act stated that Amerigroup had defrauded the government by discouraging women with advanced pregnancies as well as other high-cost patients from signing up for care under Amerigroup. However, Amerigroup argued that the state had previously agreed it was unwise for these patients to switch care provider. A federal jury ruled against the company, and Amerigroup settled the lawsuit in 2008 with $225 million.

==== The National Advisory Board and further expansion ====
Amerigroup formed the National Advisory Board (NAB) in 2007 which focused on healthcare services for seniors and people with disabilities. The board was made up of community advocates, national healthcare experts, and stakeholder groups.

In 2007 Amerigroup entered the Tennessee market with programs intended to cover two different groups of low-income people. The twofold Medicaid programs were created to serve mothers and children through the Temporary Assistance to Needy Families (TANF) program and people with long-term illnesses and disabilities eligible for Medicaid's Supplemental Security Income (SSI) program. The Tennessee subsidiary became the 10th state in which Amerigroup operated. The following fall, Amerigroup also acquired business in South Carolina, covering those eligible for certain Medicaid services.

==== McWaters retires as CEO ====
In August 2007, at age 51, Jeff McWaters retired as CEO of Amerigroup, but remained chairman of the board for one year. On July 9, 2007, a press release was published announcing the transition and change of upper management as founder and CEO Jeff McWaters retired from his role after 13 years. During a conference call conducted the same day, McWaters and his staff answered questions from analysts regarding the timing of his retirement as well as Amerigroup's future. McWaters responded with a recap of the company's achievements over the last 13 years, saying "The issue we set out to address at the state level in 1994—access, quality, and cost containment remain the central challenges facing our nation's overall healthcare system. The time is now for those of us in healthcare to take some lessons we've learned in Medicaid and apply them in a broad, more comprehensive way, ensuring access for all Americans."

In January 2005, Forbes magazine placed Amerigroup on its list of America's Best Managed Companies.

In 2010, Amerigroup broke into the Fortune 500 list, debuting at number 404. Amerigroup created over 4,600 jobs nationwide with 1,700 positions located in Virginia Beach.

Amerigroup was recognized as one of the World's Most Admired Companies by Fortune Magazine in 2011.

==== Sale of Amerigroup ====
In July 2012, WellPoint (now Elevance Health), a commercial health insurance company acquired Amerigroup for approximately $4.9 billion. Upon completion of the transaction, Amerigroup operates as a wholly owned subsidiary of Elevance Health.

== Political career ==
=== Overview ===
McWaters ran to replace outgoing Republican and sheriff-elect Ken Stolle in a special election held on January 13, 2010. He defeated city councilwoman Rosemary Wilson in the Republican primary, and Democrat Bill Fleming in the general election with 8,051 votes to Fleming's 2,184. He took office in 2010 with a focus on healthcare, military, education, and transportation in the Virginia Beach and Hampton Roads area.

In 2004, McWaters served on the Presidential Healthcare Transition team for the Bush administration. During that time, he pushed for coverage of prescription drugs for seniors under Medicare.

=== 2011 re-election ===
Senator McWaters was re-elected in November 2011. His campaign focused on issues like ensuring in-state tuition eligibility for enlisted military who had applied for Virginia residency. McWaters served on several committees, including Commerce and Labor, Transportation, Education and Health, as well as the Privileges and Elections committee. Along with ten other legislative members, McWaters served alongside Governor McDonnell's transportation work group.

=== Retirement from the Virginia Senate ===
In February 2015, after six years in office, Senator McWaters announced he would not seek re-election the following November. McWaters did not rule out the possibility of seeking another elected post in the future.

== Political positions ==
=== Jobs and the Economy ===
McWaters campaigns focused on local job creation and is outspoken about his opposition to outsourcing.

=== Healthcare ===
Healthcare was a focus of McWaters 2010 campaign for senate, during which he pushed for a competitive bidding process for Medicaid.

=== Taxes and Spending ===
McWaters believes in a smaller government and a robust private sector.

Transportation and education were also main focuses of McWaters 2010 campaign for senate.

== Trinity Church ==
In 2007, Jeff and Cindy McWaters helped found Trinity Church in Virginia Beach. Trinity Church operates five campuses; Virginia Beach Oceanfront, Princess Ann Road, Virginia Beach Town Center, Downtown Norfolk inside Nauticus and Stuttgart (Germany).

== Awards and honors ==
- In 2003, McWaters was inducted into the University of Kentucky's Gatton College of Business and Economics Hall of Fame.
- In November 2018, McWaters was inducted into the Old Dominion Strome Entrepreneurial Hall of Fame at Old Dominion University.
