= Bill DeSteph =

American politician from Virginia

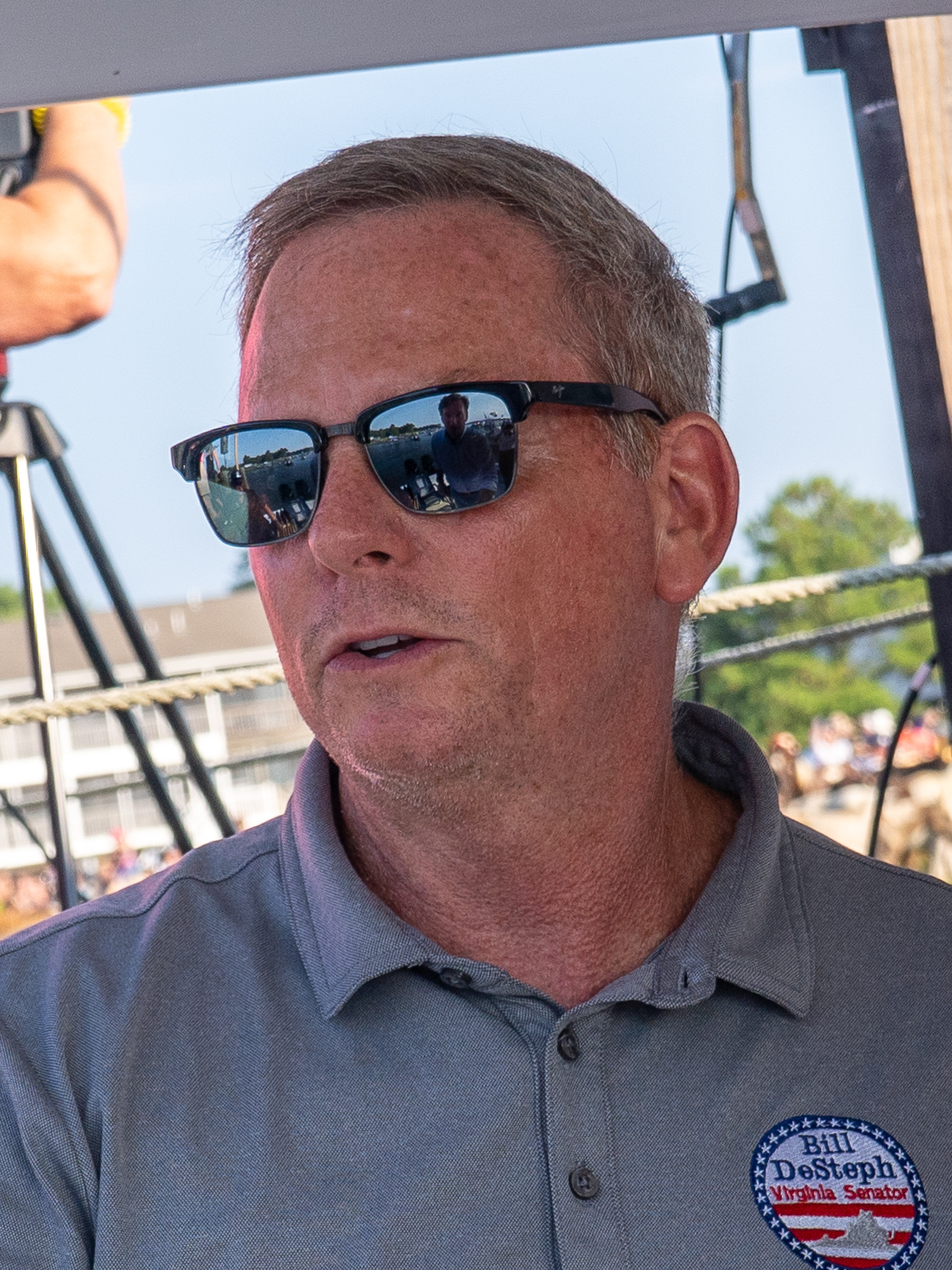
- DeSteph in 2025

Member of the Virginia Senate
- Incumbent
- Assumed office January 13, 2016
- Preceded by: Jeff McWaters
- Constituency: 8th District (2016–2024); 20th District (since 2024)

Member of the Virginia House of Delegates from the 82nd district
- In office January 8, 2014 – January 13, 2016
- Preceded by: Bob Purkey
- Succeeded by: Jason Miyares

Member of the Virginia Beach City Council At-Large
- In office July 1, 2006 – December 31, 2013
- Preceded by: Peter W. Schmidt
- Succeeded by: Brad Martin

Personal details
- Born: William Robert DeSteph Jr. October 28, 1964 (age 61) Hartford, Connecticut, U.S.
- Party: Republican
- Education: University of Maryland (BS)
- Committees: Local Government; Rehabilitation and Social Services; Transportation
- Website: www.billdesteph.org

Military service
- Allegiance: United States
- Branch/service: United States Navy

William Robert DeSteph Jr. (born October 28, 1964) is an American politician from Virginia. A member of the Republican Party, DeSteph is the member of the Virginia Senate, representing the 20th district.

DeSteph previously served in the Virginia House of Delegates, representing the 82nd district, after serving on the Virginia Beach City Council.

DeSteph has served on the boards of Children's Hospital of The King's Daughters and Prevent Child Abuse Hampton Roads, and is affiliated with the Boy Scouts of America Tidewater Council, the Noblemen, Hampton Roads Community Care, the Naval Special Warfare Foundation, and Law Enforcement United.

== Electoral history ==
Date	Election	Candidate	Party	Votes	%
Virginia House of Delegates, 82nd district
Nov 5, 2013	General	William R. DeSteph Jr.	Republican	13,995	59.78
Nov 5, 2013	General	William W. Fleming	Democratic	9,372	40.03
Nov 5, 2013	General	Write Ins		43	0.18
Nov 5, 2013	General	Bob Purkey did not seek reelection; seat stayed Republican			
Virginia Senate, 8th district
Jun 9, 2015	Primary	William R. DeSteph Jr.	Republican	2,280	71.07
Jun 9, 2015	Primary	Craig M. Hudgins	Republican	928	28.93
Nov 3, 2015	General	William R. DeSteph Jr.	Republican	15,905	58.73
Nov 3, 2015	General	H. David Belote	Democratic	11,075	40.90
Nov 3, 2015	General	Write Ins		101	0.37
Nov 3, 2015	General	Jeff McWaters did not seek reelection; seat stayed Republican			

Virginia House of Delegates
Preceded by Bob Purkey	Member of the Virginia House of Delegates from the 82nd district 2014–2016	Succeeded by Jason Miyares
Senate of Virginia
Preceded by Jeff McWaters	Member of the Virginia Senate from the 8th district 2016–2024	Succeeded by Mark Peake
Preceded by Bill Stanley	Member of the Virginia Senate from the 20th district 2024–Present	Incumbent
