= Oxford Health Plans =

Family of medical health insurance plans

Oxford Health Plans is an American health care company that sells various benefit plans, primarily in New York, New Jersey and Connecticut.

As of 2004, it is a subsidiary of UnitedHealth Group, the largest healthcare company in the world, claiming to be "among the first" to allow patients to see specialists without a referral and to offer alternative medicine treatments.

== Overview ==
The dark blue membership cards carried by members belonging to its family of Oxford Health Plans included various subtitles, such as Freedom Plan and Liberty Plan; the card's color changed to white. The Wall Street Journal described their HMO as "trend-setting" and noted that Oxford "even let patients visit specialists outside its own network."

== History ==
The company was founded in 1984 by Stephen Wiggins targeting "upscale" doctors and consumers. It claimed major growth in the 1990s increasing from 217,000 members to nearly two million. However, by mid 1998, the company had replaced its founder/CEO, and his successor, William Sullivan.

At that time, the Wall Street Journal described the company's services as "Ill-Managed Care"; earlier, in 1995, Newsweek's "Deliver, Then Depart" had criticized its practice of limiting payments for new mothers to "drive-through deliveries". In 1997 the firm had been fined $3 million for a variety of legal violations amidst false claims of alleged profits that included double counting of premiums.

In 2004 it merged with UnitedHealth Group.
