= Ken Stolle =

American politician (born 1954)

Member of the Virginia Senate from the 8th district
- In office January 8, 1992 – January 13, 2010
- Preceded by: Sonny Stallings
- Succeeded by: Jeff McWaters

Personal details
- Born: Kenneth William Stolle; July 7, 1954 (age 72) Washington, D.C., U.S.
- Party: Republican
- Spouse: Debbie
- Children: Whitney, Kenny, Ross
- Education: Berry College (BS)
- Profession: Lawyer; Police officer
- Website: www.kenstolle.com

Military service
- Allegiance: United States
- Branch/service: United States Navy
- Years of service: 1983–1991
- Rank: Lieutenant
- Unit: U.S. Naval Reserve

Kenneth William Stolle (born July 7, 1954) is an American politician of the Republican Party. He was a member of the Senate of Virginia from 1992 to 2010. He represented the 8th district in Virginia Beach. Stolle also served as the sheriff of Virginia Beach from 2010 to 2023.

== Personal life ==
Stolle's father was in the United States Navy. Stolle attended London Central High School in England, and graduated from Frank W. Cox High School in Virginia Beach in 1972. He then attended Berry College, getting an Interdisciplinary B.S. degree in Criminal Justice in 1975.

Stolle served as an officer with the Virginia Beach Police Department from 1976 to 1987. Among other duties, he was a narcotics detective and SWAT team leader. He read law while on the police force and was admitted to the Virginia State Bar in 1983. The same year, he was commissioned in the United States Naval Reserve. He served eight years in Naval Intelligence on drug interdiction matters.

Stolle left police work to become a full-time attorney in 1987.

== Political career ==
Stolle became chair of the local Republican committee in Virginia Beach in 1989. In 1991, he was elected to the state senate, defeating Democratic incumbent Moody E. "Sonny" Stallings, a Virginia Beach lawyer. He was unopposed for reelection in 1995, 1999, 2003 and 2007.

In 1997, Stolle ran for Attorney General of Virginia but finished third in a four-way Republican primary with 20.8% of the vote, behind state senator Mark Earley, who went on to win the general election that year, and Secretary of Public Safety Jerry Kilgore, who was elected to the office four years later in 2001.

Stolle was chair of the Senate Courts of Justice committee 2000–07. The Virginia Bar Association honored him with its Distinguished Service Award for his work improving Virginia's indigent defense system.

In 2007 Stolle's younger brother, Chris Stolle, ran for the 83rd district Virginia House of Delegates seat of retiring Republican Leo Wardrup. He was defeated by Democrat Joe Bouchard, 50.6% to 49.2%.

On April 3, 2009, Stolle announced his candidacy for the Republican nomination for sheriff of Virginia Beach, after incumbent Paul Lanteigne announced his retirement. Stolle also made public the fact that he had been diagnosed with Parkinson's disease about three years earlier. Stolle won the election and became sheriff in 2009. He also won subsequent elections in 2013, 2017 and 2021, before announcing his retirement in 2023.
