= Virginia's 8th Senate district =

American legislative district

Virginia's 8th State Senate district
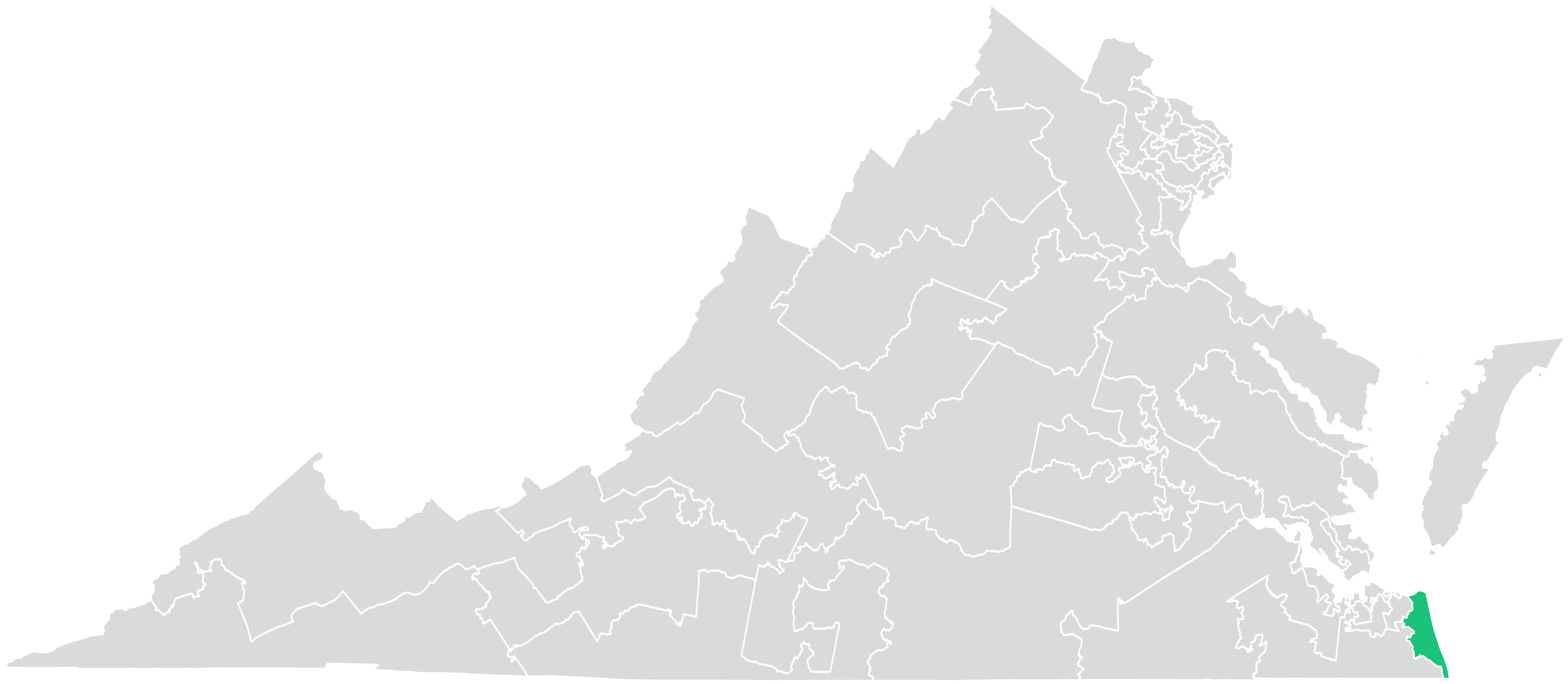
Senator
Mark Peake; R–Lynchburg
- Demographics: 66% White; 15% Black; 8% Hispanic; 5% Asian; 5% Other
- Population (2019): 199,731
- Registered voters: 139,519

Virginia's 8th Senate district is one of 40 districts in the Senate of Virginia. It has been represented by Republican Mark J. Peake since 2024. Peake previously represented Virginia's 22nd Senate district prior to redistricting.

== Geography ==
District 8 is located in west-central Virginia, including the counties of Bedford and Campbell. The independent city that is part of District 8 is Lynchburg.

The district overlaps with Virginia's 5th and 9th congressional districts, and with the 51st, 52nd, and 53rd districts of the Virginia House of Delegates.

== Recent election results ==
=== 2019 ===
2019 Virginia Senate election, District 8
Party	Candidate	Votes	%
Republican	Bill DeSteph (incumbent)	28,637	52.1
Democratic	Missy Cotter Smasal	26,242	47.7
Total votes		54,960	100
Republican hold			

=== 2015 ===
2015 Virginia Senate election, District 8
Primary election
Party	Candidate	Votes	%
Republican	Bill DeSteph	2,280	71.1
Republican	Craig Hudgins	928	28.9
Total votes		3,209	100
General election
Republican	Bill DeSteph	15,905	58.7
Democratic	Howard Belote	11,075	40.9
Total votes		27,086	100
Republican hold			

=== 2011 ===
2011 Virginia Senate election, District 8
Party	Candidate	Votes	%
Republican	Jeff McWaters (incumbent)	14,371	96.6
Total votes		14,883	100
Republican hold			

=== Federal and statewide results ===
Year	Office	Results
2020	President	Biden 49.6–48.6%
2017	Governor	Northam 49.7–49.2%
2016	President	Trump 51.0–42.9%
2014	Senate	Gillespie 53.0–44.3%
2013	Governor	Cuccinelli 48.8–44.4%
2012	President	Romney 52.6–46.1%
2012	Senate	Allen 51.5–48.5%

== Historical results ==
All election results below took place prior to 2011 redistricting, and thus were under different district lines.

=== 2010 special ===
2010 Virginia Senate special election, District 8
Party	Candidate	Votes	%
Republican	Jeff McWaters	8,052	78.6
Democratic	Bill Fleming	2,185	21.3
Total votes		10,246	100
Republican hold			

=== 2007 ===
2007 Virginia Senate election, District 8
Party	Candidate	Votes	%
Republican	Ken Stolle (incumbent)	13,137	95.6
Total votes		13,743	100
Republican hold			

=== 2003 ===
2003 Virginia Senate election, District 8
Party	Candidate	Votes	%
Republican	Ken Stolle (incumbent)	13,641	96.9
Total votes		14,081	100
Republican hold			

=== 1999 ===
1999 Virginia Senate election, District 8
Party	Candidate	Votes	%
Republican	Ken Stolle (incumbent)	25,459	97.6
Total votes		26,085	100
Republican hold			

=== 1995 ===
1995 Virginia Senate election, District 8
Party	Candidate	Votes	%
Republican	Ken Stolle (incumbent)	15,517	98.5
Total votes		15,759	100
Republican hold			
