= Ira M. Lechner =

American politician (born 1934)

Member of the Virginia House of Delegates from Arlington and Alexandria
- In office January 9, 1974 – January 1977
- Preceded by: Herbert N. Morgan
- Succeeded by: Elise B. Heinz

Personal details
- Born: May 4, 1934 (age 91) New York City, U.S.
- Party: Democratic
- Spouses: Susan Schwartz (m. 1959; div. 1985) Carol Cunningham Parr (m. 1988; died 1992) Eileen Boyle Haag (m. 1999)
- Education: Randolph-Macon College,
- Alma mater: Yale Law School

Ira Mark Lechner (born May 4, 1934) is an American lawyer, government official, civic activist, and Democratic politician who represented Arlington and Alexandria in the Virginia General Assembly for four years. He ran for other elective offices in Virginia and Maryland.

== Biography ==
Born in New York City, Lechner received a Bachelor's degree from Randolph-Macon College in Virginia, then traveled to Connecticut to study law at Yale Law School and received an LLB degree. He married Susan Schwartz in 1958, and they had two children before that marriage ended. He married Carol Parr, who died in May, 1992. He married Eileen Haag in 1999.

Lechner served as an appellate attorney in the United States Army Judge Advocate General's Corps, the Appellate Division of the National Labor Relations Board, and on the staff of the Employment and Productivity Subcommittee of the United States Senate Committee on Labor and Human Resources. He then practiced law as a solo practitioner or in partnerships in Washington, D.C., and Virginia for more than four decades, specializing in civil rights and labor cases, including on behalf of federal employees.

Lechner also became active in the Democratic party, as well as in his synagogue and B'nai Brith. Voters in the 23rd district, comprising parts of Arlington and Alexandria, elected Lechner to replace Republican Herbert N. Morgan in the Virginia House of Delegate in 1973, and he began his part-time service in the Virginia General Assembly the following January. Lechner won re-election once, and following the 1977 election was succeeded by fellow Democrat as well as fellow lawyer Elise B. Heinz. Lechner was unsuccessful in two Democratic primaries seeking nomination as Lieutenant Governor of Virginia, and also unsuccessfully opposed Republican U.S. Congressman Frank Wolf in 1982. He ran for the State Senate in Maryland in 1990.

Lechner retired to near San Diego, California. His family foundation supports sustainable development in South Africa, and he also served on the Council for Higher Education Accreditation. In 2008 Lechner organized a fundraising committee for then Illinois senator Barack Obama's presidential candidacy, and from 2008 until 2014 served as chairman of the board of trustees of the Council for a Livable World, succeeding former U.S. Senator Gary Hart, and advocating for progressive national security policies. Lechner and Haag founded "Inspire U.S.," an organization encouraging voter registration by teenagers.

Virginia House of Delegates
Preceded by Herbert N. Morgan	Representing Arlington and Alexandria; 1974–1977	Succeeded by Elise B. Heinz
