= List of mergers of securities firms =

Overview of company mergers

The following is a list of mergers of securities firms.

== List ==
Year Merger closed	Acquirer	Acquired firm	Name of merged entity
1931	Harriman Brothers & Company	Brown Bros. & Co.	Brown Brothers Harriman & Co.
1938	Charles D. Barney & Co.	Edward B. Smith & Co.	Smith Barney & Co.
1940	Merrill Lynch	E. A. Pierce & Co.	Merrill Lynch
1940	Merrill Lynch	Cassatt & Co.	Merrill Lynch
1942	Paine, Webber & Co.	Jackson & Curtis	Paine, Webber, Jackson & Curtis
1946	First Boston Corporation	Mellon Securities Corporation	First Boston Corporation
1947	Lonsdale Investment Trust	Robert Benson & Co.	Robert Benson Lonsdale
1956	Eastman Dillon & Co.	Union Securities	Eastman Dillon Union Securities & Co.
1957	S. G. Warburg & Co.	Seligman Bros.	S. G. Warburg & Co.
1961	Robert Benson Lonsdale	Kleinwort, Sons & Co.	Kleinwort Benson Limited
1965	Drexel and Company	Harriman, Ripley and Company	Drexel Harriman Ripley
1965	Philip Hill, Higginson, Erlanger’s Limited	M. Samuel & Co.	Hill Samuel & Co.
1970	Cogan, Berlind, Weill & Levitt	Hayden, Stone & Co.	CBWL-Hayden, Stone, Inc.
1970	Mason & Co.	Legg & Co.	Legg Mason & Co.
1972	Eastman Dillon Union Securities & Co.	Blyth & Co.	Blyth, Eastman, Dillon & Co.
1973	Burnham and Company	Drexel Harriman Ripley	Drexel Burnham and Company
1973	Hayden Stone	H. Hentz	Hayden Stone
1973	Hayden Stone	Saul Lerner & Company	Hayden Stone
1974	Hayden Stone	Shearson, Hammill & Co.	Shearson Hayden Stone
1975	Lehman Brothers	Abraham & Co.	Lehman Brothers
1975	Smith Barney & Co.	Harris, Upham & Co.	Smith Barney, Harris Upham & Co.
1976	Shearson Hayden Stone	Lamson Brothers	Shearson Hayden Stone
1976	Shearson Hayden Stone	Faulkner, Dawkins & Sullivan	Shearson Hayden Stone
1976	Drexel Burnham and Company	William D. Witter	Drexel Burnham Lambert
1977	Lehman Brothers	Kuhn, Loeb & Co.	Lehman Brothers, Kuhn, Loeb
1977	Morgan Stanley	Shuman, Agnew & Co	Morgan Stanley
1977	Paine Webber	Mitchell Hutchins	Paine Webber
1978	Loeb, Rhoades & Co.	Hornblower, Weeks, Noyes & Trask	Loeb, Rhoades, Hornblower & Co.
1978	Dean Witter	Reynolds & Co.	Dean Witter Reynolds
1978	Merrill Lynch	White Weld & Co.	Merrill Lynch
1979	Shearson Hayden Stone	Loeb, Rhoades, Hornblower & Co.	Shearson Loeb Rhoades
1979	Paine Webber	Blyth, Eastman Dillon & Co.	Paine Webber
1981	Goldman, Sachs & Co.	J. Aron & Co.	Goldman, Sachs & Co.
1981	Philipp Brothers	Salomon Brothers	Phibro-Salomon Inc.
1981	Prudential Insurance	Halsey, Stuart & Co.	Prudential Securities
1981	American Express	Shearson Loeb Rhoades	Shearson/American Express
1984	Shearson/American Express	Investors Diversified Services	Shearson/American Express
1984	Shearson/American Express	Lehman Brothers, Kuhn, Loeb	Shearson Lehman/American Express
1987	Primerica	Smith Barney	Primerica
1987	Union Bank of Switzerland	Phillips & Drew	Union Bank of Switzerland
1987	TSB Group Plc.	Hill Samuel & Co.	TSB Group Plc.
1988	Shearson Lehman/American Express	E.F. Hutton	Shearson Lehman Hutton
1988	Credit Suisse	First Boston Corporation	Credit Suisse First Boston
1988	Commercial Credit	Primerica	Primerica
1990	Deutsche Bank	Morgan Grenfell	Deutsche Bank
1993	Primerica	Shearson Lehman Hutton (Brokerage and Asset Management)	Primerica (Smith Barney Shearson)
1993	Lehman Brothers (Spinoff from American Express)	Shearson Lehman Hutton	Lehman Brothers
1995	Paine Webber	Kidder, Peabody & Co.	PaineWebber Group
1995	Swiss Bank Corporation	S. G. Warburg & Co.	Swiss Bank Corporation
1995	Dresdner Bank	Kleinwort Benson	Dresdner Kleinwort Benson
1996	Chemical Bank	Chase Manhattan Bank	Chase Manhattan Bank
1996	Morgan Stanley	Van Kampen American Capital	Morgan Stanley
1997	Bankers Trust	Alex. Brown & Sons	Bankers Trust (BT Alex. Brown & Sons)
1997	Swiss Bank Corporation	Dillon, Read & Co.	Swiss Bank Corporation (Warburg Dillon Read)
1997	Travelers Group	Salomon Brothers	Travelers Group (Salomon Smith Barney)
1997	Dean Witter Discover & Co.	Morgan Stanley	Morgan Stanley Dean Witter
1998	Union Bank of Switzerland	Swiss Bank Corporation	UBS AG (UBS Warburg)
1998	Travelers Group	Citicorp	Citigroup (Salomon Smith Barney)
1998	Société Générale	Hambros Bank	Société Générale (SG Hambros Bank Ltd)
1999	Deutsche Bank	Bankers Trust	Deutsche Bank (Deutsche Bank Alex. Brown)
1999	Chase Manhattan Bank	Hambrecht & Quist	Chase Manhattan Bank
2000	PaineWebber Group	J.C. Bradford & Co.	PaineWebber Group
2000	UBS AG	PaineWebber Group	UBS AG (UBS Paine Webber)
2000	Credit Suisse First Boston	Donaldson, Lufkin & Jenrette	Credit Suisse First Boston
2000	Dresdner Kleinwort	Wasserstein Perella & Co.	Dresdner Kleinwort Wasserstein
2000	Chase Manhattan Bank	Robert Fleming & Co.	Chase Manhattan Bank
2001	Lehman Brothers	Cowen & Co. (PCS Business)	Lehman Brothers
2001	Chase Manhattan Bank	J. P. Morgan & Co.	JPMorgan Chase & Co.
2001	Société Générale	TCW Group	Société Générale
2002	Deutsche Bank	Scudder Investments	Deutsche Bank
2003	Lehman Brothers	Crossroads Group	Lehman Brothers
2003	Lehman Brothers	Neuberger Berman	Lehman Brothers
2006	Lehman Brothers	H.A. Schupf & Co.	Lehman Brothers
2007	Wachovia	A. G. Edwards	Wachovia Securities
2008	JPMorgan Chase & Co.	Bear Stearns	JPMorgan Chase & Co.
2008	Bank of America	Merrill Lynch	BofA Securities
2008	Ameriprise Financial	J. & W. Seligman & Co.	Ameriprise Financial
2009	Morgan Stanley	Smith Barney	Morgan Stanley (Morgan Stanley Smith Barney)
