= Hefty =

American brand of household products

- Current owner: Reynolds Consumer Products, Inc
- Country: United States
- Introduced: 1965; 61 years ago
- Previous owners: Mobil, Tenneco Packaging, Pactiv Corporation
- Website: hefty.com

Hefty is an American brand of household products such as trash bags and trash cans, disposable tableware, children's disposable tableware (including their reintroduced ZooPals product line), slider closure food storage and freezer bags, plastic storage bins, and disposable cookware. Originally a Mobil product, the brand has been owned by Reynolds Consumer Products since 2010.

== Retailers ==
Hefty products are sold nationwide (in stores and online) at grocery stores, drugstores, and other mass merchandisers in the United States.

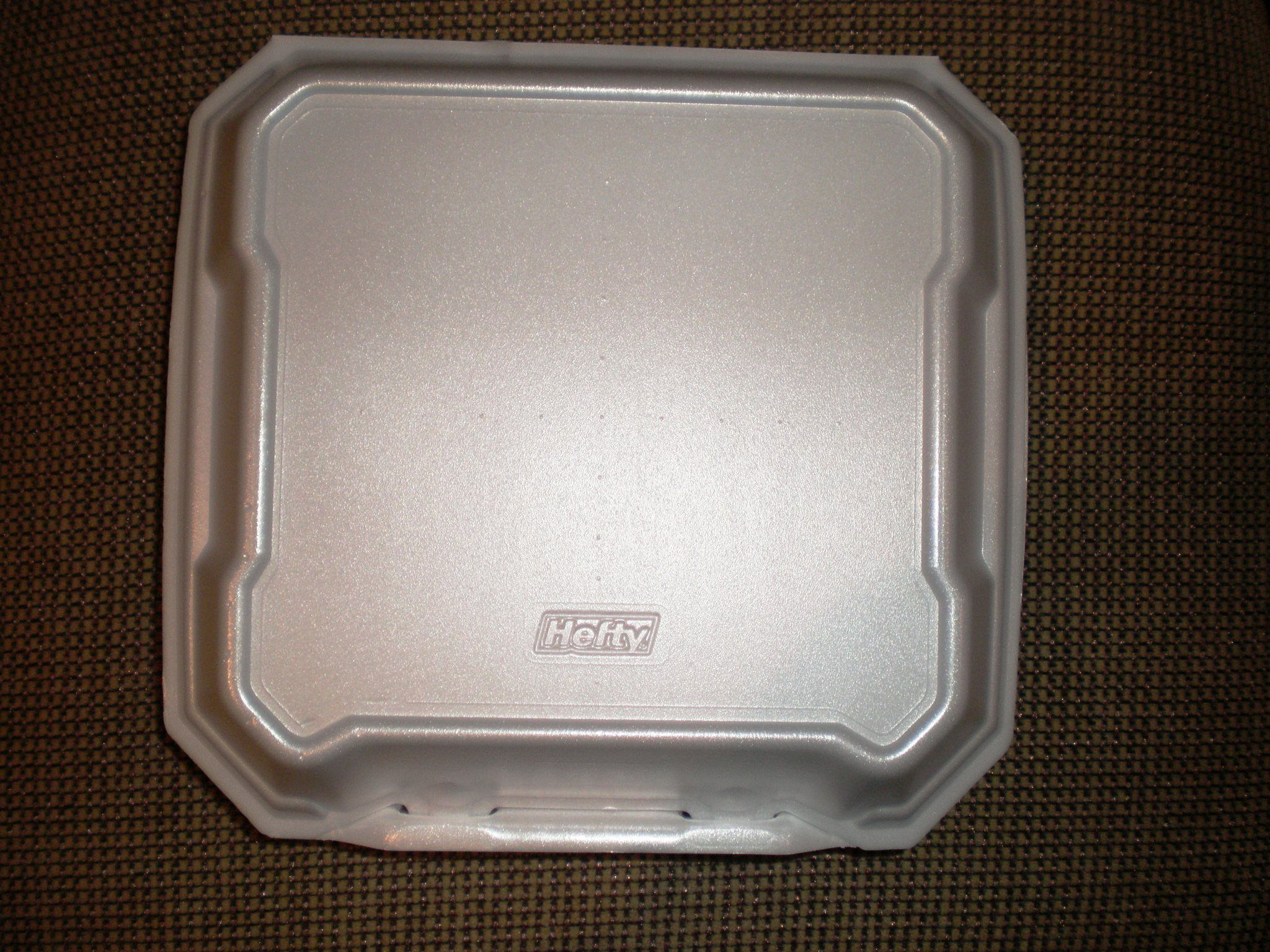
A Hefty brand food container.

== History ==
Hefty was founded by Mobil in 1965. Plastics Division headquartered in Macedon, New York, was acquired by Tenneco Packaging in 1995 with a $1.27 billion purchase of Mobil's 4,100-employee plastics division, then Pactiv Corporation (1999–2010). Hefty products have been owned or licensed by Reynolds Consumer Products, Inc, headquartered in Lake Forest, Illinois since Pactiv was acquired by Reynolds' parent company, Reynolds Group Holdings, on November 16, 2010.

=== OneZip ===
The Hefty OneZip sliding tab sealable bag, formerly known as the "rolling-action zipper profile and slipper", was created by Eric A. St. Phillips and F. John Harrington Jr. at Mobil in the early 1990s at a cost of $25 to $50 million, after having developed and evaluated various different zipper designs, and finally deciding to roll out the "boxcar-shaped version", which slides over dual plastic tracks.

=== Environmental concerns ===
Hefty was one of the brands (along with Kordite and Baggies (another Pactiv brand)) named in a complaint brought against Mobil by the United States Federal Trade Commission in 1992, regarding claims made by the company in advertisements and packaging, which allegedly led consumers to believe that the bags were more biodegradable than other brands of bag, despite a lack of evidence to support this claim nor presentation of a specific definition for the term. The FTC dropped their complaint after Mobil agreed to cease making such claims.

== See also ==
- Biodegradable plastic
- Glad (company)
