= Greenware =

Greenware may refer to:

- Greenware or Celadon, Chinese pottery in a range of jade-like green colours
- Greenware (pottery), unfired clay pottery
- Greenware (computing), software distributed under the condition that the user does something to help the environment
- Greenware, the brand name of a 100% corn based cup produced by Fabri-Kal
