= Dean Witter Reynolds =

American financial company

- Formerly: Dean Witter & Co. (1924-1978)
- Type: Public
- Traded as: NYSE: DWR (until 1997)
- Industry: Financial services
- Predecessor: Dean Witter & Co.; Reynolds Securities
- Founded: 1924; 102 years ago
- Founder: Dean G. Witter
- Defunct: 1997; 29 years ago
- Fate: Acquired and Merged with Morgan Stanley
- Headquarters: New York City; San Francisco
- Products: Brokerage
- Revenue: ▲$1.132 billion (1996)
- Net income: ▲$951 million (1996)
- Total assets: ▲$17.3 billion
- Number of employees: 33,084 (12/31/96)
- Subsidiaries: Discover Card (prior)

Dean Witter Reynolds was an American stock brokerage and securities firm catering to a variety of clients. Prior to the company's acquisition, it was among the largest firms in the securities industry with over 9,000 account executives (ranking third in the US in 1996) and was among the largest members of the New York Stock Exchange. The company served over 3.2 million clients primarily in the U.S. Dean Witter provided debt and equity underwriting and brokerage as well as mutual funds and other saving and investment products for individual investors. The company's asset management arm, Dean Witter InterCapital, with total assets of $90.0 billion prior to the acquisition, was one of the largest asset management operations in the U.S.

Dean Witter Reynolds was founded in 1978 as the merger of Dean Witter & Co. and Reynolds Securities (with Dean Witter acquiring Reynolds), which was then the biggest merger in the history of Wall Street. The company was acquired by Sears in 1981 and was renamed "Dean Witter, Discover & Co." in 1993 when Sears spun off the company. The company also owned Discover Card.

In 1997, Dean Witter, Discover & Co. merged with investment banking house Morgan Stanley to form "Morgan Stanley Dean Witter & Discover Co.". The combined firm later dropped the "Discover Co." name in 1998 and further the "Dean Witter" name in 2001.

For many years, the company used the corporate slogan, "We measure success one investor at a time", which was later adopted by Morgan Stanley.

== Business overview ==
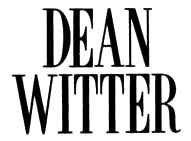
Dean Witter logo, c. 1990

Prior to its merger with Morgan Stanley, Dean Witter Reynolds was a diversified financial services organization that provided a broad range of investment and consumer credit and investment products and services. Dean Witter operated in two lines of business: securities (including investment banking) and credit services and its operations were primarily focused on the U.S.

The following is a summary of the financial results of Dean Witter prior to its merger with Morgan Stanley:

Financial data in $ millions
Year	1996	1995	1994
Revenue	$1,132	$1,338	$998
Operating Income	$506	$788	$658
Net Income	$951	$856	$741
Total assets	$17,344	$15,507	-
Shareholder's equity	$5,164	$4,834	-

=== Securities business ===
Dean Witter's traditional business was as a full-service securities brokerage. The company maintained a network of over 9,000 account executives. DWR was among the largest members of the New York Stock Exchange and was a member of other major securities, futures, and options exchanges. Dean Witter offered a broad range of securities and savings products that were supported by the firm's underwriting and research activities as well as order execution. Closely related to its securities business, Dean Witter provided investment consulting services to individual investors. The firm managed approximately $10.4 billion of assets in its consulting business as of the end of 1996. Within its securities business, Dean Witter focused on three segments:

- Equity Securities – Dean Witter provided order execution, stock trading and equity research services primarily to individual investors but also to institutional clients. In many equity securities, Dean Witter acted as a market maker and as a specialist on various exchanges. Dean Witter's research department provided economic analysis and commentary, market and quantitative research, as well as making recommendations with regard to broad individual companies and industry sectors.
- Fixed Income Securities – Dean Witter provided trading and order execution services for a broad range of fixed income securities, including U.S. Treasury bonds, mortgage-backed securities, corporate bonds, municipal bonds and certificates of deposit. The company was a primary dealer in U.S. Treasury bonds. The firm largely eschewed proprietary trading focusing its trading activity on establishing and maintaining an inventory of various securities.
- Futures – Dean Witter also provided order execution and clearing services for the trading of futures contracts.

=== Investment banking ===
Dean Witter also operated as an investment banking firm, even before its merger with Morgan Stanley. Like many of its peers, Dean Witter provided a range of advisory services to corporate clients including mergers and acquisitions, divestitures, leveraged buyouts, restructurings and recapitalizations. The Company generally did not commit capital to merchant banking transactions.

However, the firm always maintained a strong connection between its investment banking business and its core business focused on individual investors. As a result, the investment banking division was involved in the research, development, and origination of investment products focused on individual investors including limited partnerships and other retail-oriented products.

The company's InterCapital subsidiary, with $90.0 billion of assets under management as of December 31, 1996, was one of the largest investment management businesses in the U.S.

=== Credit cards (Discover Card and Novus) ===
Dean Witter was also active in the issuance of credit cards through its Discover Card business. Discover Card, which today operates is the company's most widely held proprietary general-purpose credit card and generated a majority of Credit Services' revenues and net income in 1996. Prior to its merger, Dean Witter's credit cards business accounted for 52% and 47% of the company's net income in 1995 and 1996, respectively.

In addition to the Discover Card, the company operated the NOVUS Network. In the mid-1990s, the NOVUS Network was the third-largest domestic credit card network and consisted of merchant and cash locations that accept card brands that carry the NOVUS logo. In addition to the Discover Card, this the NOVUS network included Private Issue Card, the BRAVO Card and the National Alliance For Species Survival SM Card.

== History ==
Dean Witter Reynolds traced its origins to two firms: Dean Witter & Co. founded in 1924 and Reynolds & Co. (later Reynolds Securities) founded in 1931.

=== Dean Witter & Co. (1924–1978) ===
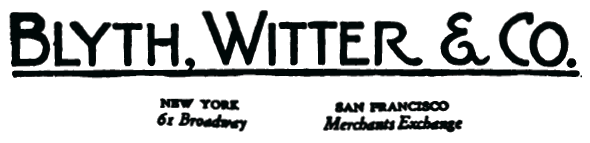
Blyth Witter & Co., the firm's predecessor was founded in 1914 by Dean G. Witter and Charles R. Blyth. Blyth Witter's other successor firm was known as Blyth & Co. and later Blyth, Eastman Dillon & Co.

Dean Witter & Company was founded by Dean G. Witter (together with his brother Guy Witter and cousin Jean Witter) as a retail brokerage firm in 1924. With its original offices at 45 Montgomery Street in San Francisco, California, Dean Witter would be among the largest brokerages on the West Coast. Among Witter's original partners were Guy and Jean, as well as cousin Ed Witter and Fritz Janney. Prior to founding his own firm, Witter partnered with Charles R. Blyth to found Blyth, Witter & Co., another San Francisco based brokerage in 1914. After Witter's departure, Blyth would continue on his own (his firm was ultimately acquired by Paine Webber in 1979) and the two firms would remain competitors for decades.

Witter's family had moved to Northern California from Wausau, Wisconsin, settling in San Carlos, California in 1891. Before founding his own firms, Dean Witter had worked as a salesman for Louis Sloss & Company from his graduation from the University of California, Berkeley in 1909 until 1914. Dean Witter died in 1969; the following year his brother Guy Witter retired, and Jean Witter's son, William M. Witter, became chief executive.

In its early years, Dean Witter focused on dealing with municipal and corporate bonds. The company was highly successful in its first five years, purchasing a seat on the San Francisco Stock Exchange in 1928 and then opening an office in New York and purchasing a seat on the New York Stock Exchange in 1929. Although a relatively young company, Dean Witter survived Wall Street crash of 1929 and the Great Depression, posting profits every year during the 1930s and into the 1940s.

Dean Witter & Co. logo c. 1976

The company grew rapidly during the 1950s and 1960s, establishing itself as a major U.S. brokerage house and developing a reputation for innovation in the securities industry. In 1938, Dean Witter established its national research department, and in 1945, became the first retail securities firm to offer formal training for account executives. In 1953, the firm entered into an agreement to merge with Harris, Hall & Co., a Chicago investment banking and securities firm spun out of Harris Bank after the passage of the Glass Steagall Act. In the early 1950s, Harris, Hall was one of the 17 U.S. investment banking and securities firms named in the Justice Department's antitrust investigation of Wall Street commonly known as the Investment bankers case. In 1962, Dean Witter became the first firm to use electronic data processing – a feat that paved the way for securities handling on Wall Street.

Following Witter's death in 1969, and the retirement of Guy Witter the following year, Jean Witter's son, William M. Witter, became CEO of Dean Witter & Co. After numerous brokerage firm acquisitions, Dean Witter went public in 1972. Dean Witter's initial public offering (shortly after the IPO of Reynolds Securities) was part of a rush of Wall Street firms to sell an interest in their privately held businesses to public investors, following Merrill Lynch's initial public offering in early 1971.

=== Reynolds Securities (1931–1978) ===
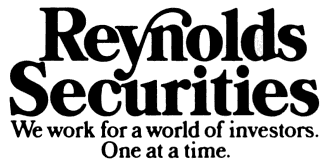
Reynolds Securities logo from 1977

Reynolds & Co. was founded in 1931 in New York City by Richard S. Reynolds Jr., a 22-year-old tobacco heir, together with Charles H. Babcock and Thomas F. Staley. In particular, Thomas F. Staley was Reynolds' cousin (the grandson of Major D. Reynolds, an older brother of R.J. Reynolds). In 1951, another senior partner, John D. Baker, joined the company. Reynolds' father Richard S. Reynolds Sr. founded U.S. Foil Company, later Reynolds Metals (Reynolds wrap), and his great uncle was the founder of R. J. Reynolds Tobacco Company (RJR).

Like Dean Witter, the company survived the Depression, generating a profit each year. In 1934, Reynolds acquired F.A. Willard & Co. With the acquisition, Reynolds tripled its sales and shifted its emphasis toward underwritings.

In 1958, Reynolds passed its leadership to the next generation with Thomas F. Staley departing and naming Robert M. Gardiner to head the firm. Under Gardiner, Reynolds embarks on a major expansion, acquiring 26 offices from A.M. Kidder & Co. Reynolds acquired another three offices and opened nine firms in new regions in the U.S. in the early 1960s.

Reynolds was incorporated in 1971 as Reynolds Securities in advance of an initial public offering. By early 1971, there was speculation that Merrill Lynch would sell shares to the public. Reynolds initial public offering (and shortly thereafter Dean Witter's IPO) was part of a rush of Wall Street firms to sell an interest in their privately held businesses to public investors, following Merrill Lynch's initial public offering. In 1976, Reynolds implements REYCOM, the most sophisticated high-speed wire system in the industry. Meanwhile, the firm was continuing its expansion, acquiring its first international offices in Lugano and Lausanne, Switzerland. A year later, Reynolds acquired Baker Weeks & Co. whose strength was securities research.

At the time of its merger with Dean Witter in 1978, Reynolds Securities had over 3,100 employees in 72 offices producing gross revenues of nearly $120 million.

=== The Dean Witter Reynolds merger and the Sears acquisition (1978–1993) ===
In 1978 Dean Witter and Reynolds merged to form Dean Witter Reynolds Organization Inc. (DWRO) in what was then the largest securities-industry merger in U.S. history. The resultant company, Dean Witter Reynolds, was the fifth-largest broker in the U.S. One year later Dean Witter Reynolds became the first securities firm to have offices in all 50 U.S. states and Washington, D.C. After completion of the merger, Dean Witter Reynolds generated revenue of more than $520 million.

Dean Witter logo under Sears ownership c. 1984

In 1981, Dean Witter Reynolds was acquired by Sears, Roebuck and Company in a $600 million transaction. Sears' core retail business was facing several challenges, and the company decided to diversify into new businesses, including financial services. Sears, which was already in the financial services business through its ownership of the Allstate Insurance Company announced a major acquisition initiative in financial services. In addition to the acquisition of Dean Witter, Sears also acquired Coldwell Banker, the real estate brokerage company in 1981. Sears intended for Dean Witter to form the foundation for a larger Sears Financial Services Network that would be available to customers through the company's retail stores.

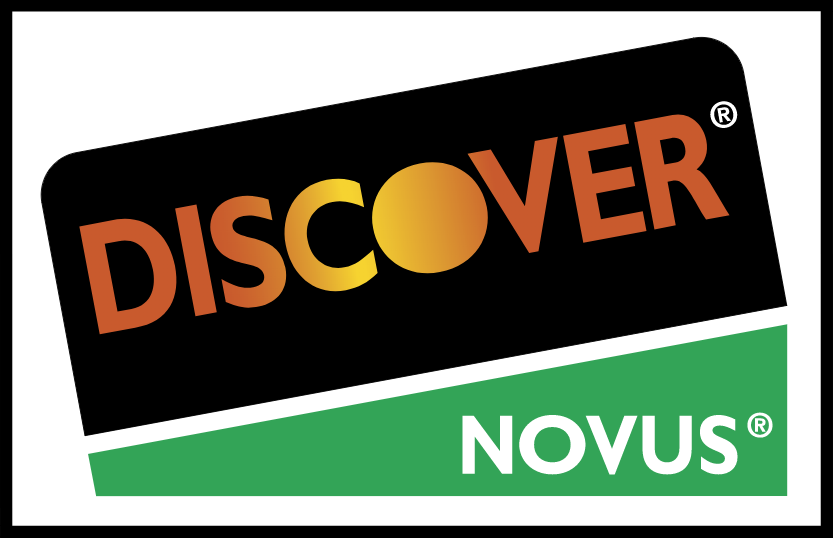
Dean Witter, under Sears ownership, launched the Discover Card in 1986

Sears named Philip J. Purcell, a strategic planner at the Sears Chicago headquarters and former McKinsey & Co. consultant, to head Dean Witter. Purcell moved to New York to run the operation from Dean Witter's office. At the time of the Sears acquisition, Dean Witter Reynolds had a retail broker force of over 4,500 account executives in over 300 locations with over 11,500 employees in total. For the year ended 1980, Dean Witter Reynolds generated over $700 million of revenue.

Under Sears ownership, in 1986, the firm launched the Discover Card, a new brand of credit card outside the well established Visa, MasterCard and American Express networks. Unlike other attempts at creating a credit card to rival MasterCard and VISA, such as Citibank's Choice card, the Discover Card quickly gained a large national consumer base. It carried no annual fee, which was uncommon at the time, and offered a typically higher credit limit than similar cards. Cardholders could earn a "cashback bonus", in which a percentage of the amount spent would be refunded to the account (originally 2%, now as high as 5%), depending on how much the card was used. Discover offered merchant fees significantly lower than those of other widely accepted credit cards. Eventually, Discover grew to become one of the largest credit card issuers in the U.S.

=== Dean Witter Discover (1993–1997) ===
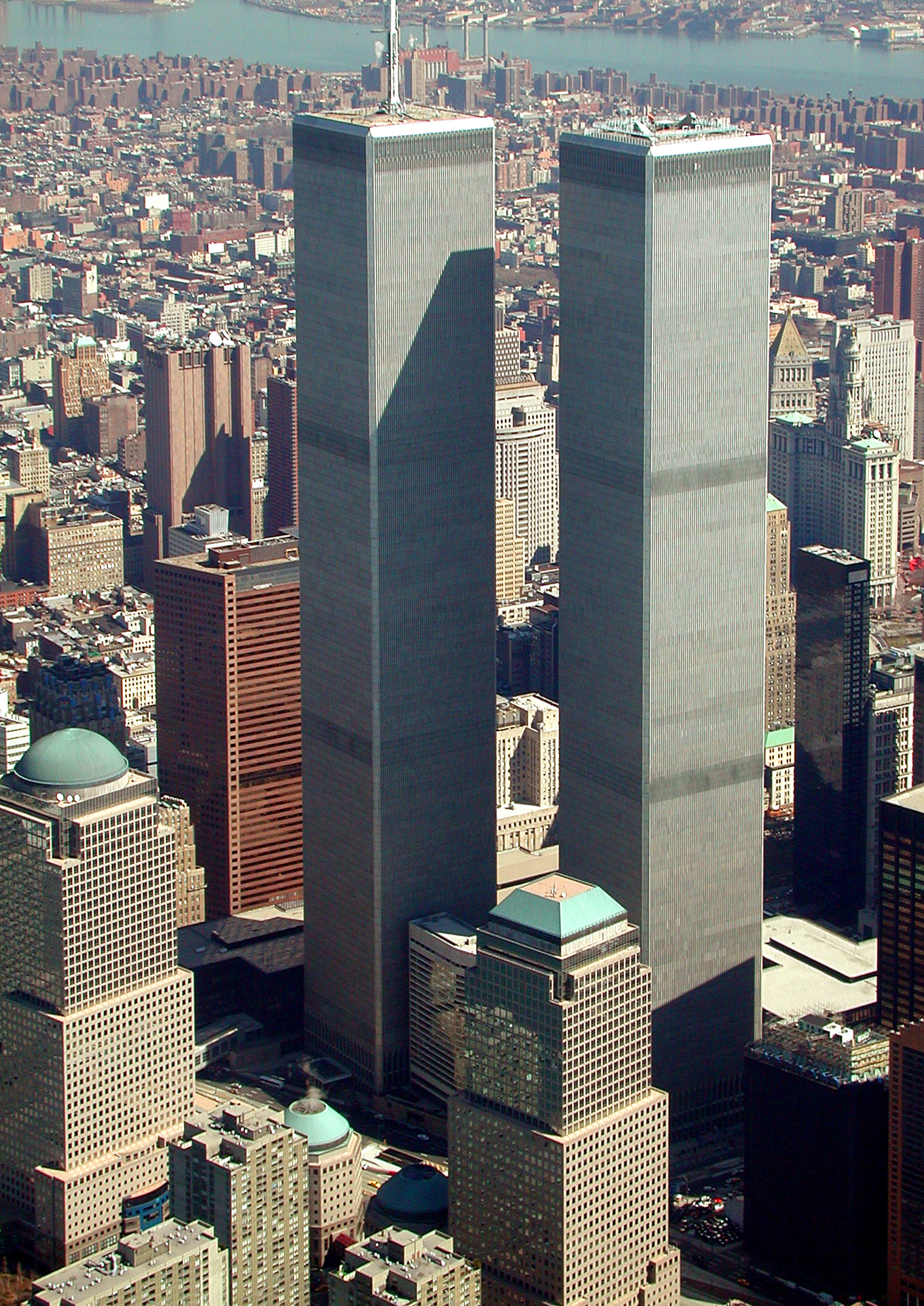
Dean Witter was headquartered in 2 World Trade Center, occupying 864,000 sq. ft., from 1985 until its merger with Morgan Stanley in 1997)

Sears' financial services initiative proved highly successful as Discover grew through the late 1980s and early 1990s. Furthermore, the substantial investment in the Discover business also began to pay off, with the business becoming highly profitable. The early 1990s were also a period of rapid growth for Dean Witter Reynolds as its strategy of focusing on the distribution of proprietary mutual funds through its extensive retail brokerage network began to bear fruit.

Dean Witter's core securities business and its Discover business generated combined revenue of $59 billion in 1992 and Sears announced that it would seek to monetize its investment. In February and March 1993, Sears sold 20% of the company in an initial public offering, and the company was subsequently renamed Dean Witter, Discover & Co., with two primary operating subsidiaries: Dean Witter Reynolds and Discover Card. Later that year, the remaining 80% of shares were distributed to Sears' shareholders, giving Dean Witter complete independence from Sears.

Dean Witter's corporate headquarters were located in New York City's 2 World Trade Center (i.e. South Tower), where the firm had occupied over 864,000 square feet (80,300 m^{2}) since 1985. Dean Witter was one of many tenants whose offices were evacuated as a result of the 1993 World Trade Center bombing, which took place during the firm's spinoff from Sears. Following, the firm's merger with Morgan Stanley, the firm's headquarters would be moved to 1585 Broadway on the edge of New York's Time Square. Morgan Stanley Dean Witter still had a large presence at the World Trade Center during the September 11 attacks on September 11, 2001.

Dean Witter was the first big brokerage company to get into the online trading business when it bought a small San Francisco-based outfit called Lombard Brokerage in 1996.

=== Merger with Morgan Stanley (1997–2009) ===
Morgan Stanley Dean Witter logo c. 2000. The combined company dropped the usage of the Dean Witter brand in 2001

In 1997, Morgan Stanley Group, Inc. and Dean Witter Discover merged to form one of the largest global financial services firms: Morgan Stanley Dean Witter & Discover Co.. The combined firm later dropped the "Discover Co." name in 1998 and further the "Dean Witter" name in 2001.

Although Morgan Stanley was the more prominent partner, Dean Witter's focus on retail investors, mutual funds and credit cards which were seen by the stock market as generating more stable cash flows than Morgan Stanley's investment banking business had by the time of the merger made it the more valuable partner in terms of market capitalization. Dean Witter's CEO, Philip Purcell, the main architect of the merger, became chairman and chief executive officer of the merged group. The merger marked the pairing of a storied investment banking firm with a retail brokerage (that had been owned by a retailer) that was often termed "white shoes and white socks". In order to avoid tension during the integration of the two firms, Purcell and Morgan Stanley's CEO John Mack decided not to choose between the two brand names. Instead, they combined the names of the two firms and put the Morgan Stanley Dean Witter brand on almost all of its operations.

Eventually, to foster brand recognition and marketing, the Dean Witter name was dropped from the retail services division in 2001, leaving the current name Morgan Stanley. In 2009, the Dean Witter retail operations were transferred to Morgan Stanley Smith Barney, a joint venture with Citigroup.

=== Acquisition history ===
The following is an illustration of the company's major mergers and acquisitions and historical predecessors:

- Morgan Stanley Dean Witter (merged 1997, later Morgan Stanley)
  - Morgan Stanley (est. 1935)
    - J.P. Morgan & Co. (The House of Morgan)
      (est. 1871)
  - Dean Witter Reynolds (merged 1978)
    - Dean Witter & Co.
      (est. 1924)
    - Reynolds Securities
      (est. 1931)

== Notable alumni ==
- Garo H. Armen
- Lauren Bessette, sister-in-law of John F. Kennedy Jr.
- Jean Chatzky, research analyst
- George Davidsohn
- Chris Gardner, whose autobiography was turned into the 2006 feature film The Pursuit of Happyness, interned at Dean Witter Reynolds
- Thomas J. Healey
- Catherine Meyer
- John Moore, Baron Moore of Lower Marsh, stockbroker
- Gretchen Morgenson
- Rick Rescorla
- Ronald P. Spogli, investment banker
- Thomas J. Wilson

== See also ==
- Morgan Stanley
- Morgan Stanley Smith Barney
- Discover Card
