= Merrill Lynch High Yield Master II =

Index for high-yield corporate bonds

The BofA Merrill Lynch US High Yield Master II Index (H0A0) is a bond index for high-yield corporate bonds. It is administered by Bank of America Merrill Lynch. The Master II is a measure of the broad high yield market, unlike the Merrill Lynch BB/B Index, which excludes lower-rated securities. The index tracks the performance of US dollar denominated below investment grade rated corporate debt publicly issued in the US domestic market.

== History ==
The High Yield Master II Index came into being in 1989. Martin Fridson, who then headed Merrill Lynch's high yield bond research department, brought a problem to the attention of Phil Galdi, who was responsible for bond indexes. The existing High Yield Master Index excluded two types of issues that were becoming popular because of the boom in leveraged buyout financing, zero-coupon bonds and payment-in-kind (PIK) bonds. Galdi's solution was to maintain the existing rules for the Master Index, but to create a new index that included "zeros" and PIKs. The new Master II was introduced with retroactive data that extended its history back to August 31, 1986.

== See also ==
- Martin Fridson
- Zero-coupon bond
- PIK Bond
