= Jackson & Curtis =

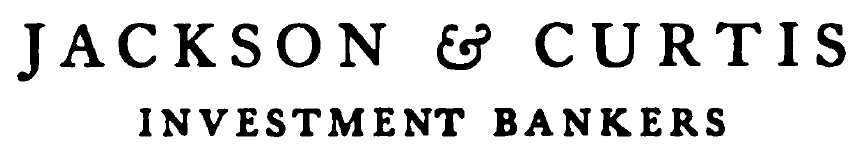
- Type: Acquired
- Industry: Financial services
- Founded: 1879
- Founder: Charles Cabot Jackson; Laurence Curtis
- Defunct: 1984
- Fate: Merged in 1942 with Paine Webber
- Successor: Paine, Webber, Jackson & Curtis; UBS AG
- Headquarters: Boston, Massachusetts
- Products: Brokerage, Investment management

Jackson & Curtis was founded in 1879 in Boston, Massachusetts, by Charles Cabot Jackson and Laurence Curtis. Operating with two employees, they leased premises on Congress Street in May 1881, not far from Paine Webber. Members of the Boston Stock Exchange, in 1890 the company acquired a seat on the New York Stock Exchange.

It was an American investment banking and stock brokerage firm that merged with Paine Webber in 1942. The firm operated as Paine Webber Jackson & Curtis through 1984, when Paine Webber Inc. was created to consolidate the company's various businesses and subsidiaries under a single brand. Paine Webber was ultimately acquired by the Swiss bank UBS AG in 2000.

== History ==
=== Founding and early history ===
In July 1879, Charles Cabot Jackson and Laurence Curtis founded their investment banking firm Jackson & Curtis on Congress Street in Boston, Massachusetts.

Following the difficult years of the Great Depression, in June 1942, Jackson & Curtis merged with Paine & Webber, another Boston-based brokerage firm. The combined firm, Paine, Webber, Jackson & Curtis, operated a combined total of 22 branch offices. With its greater combined asset base Paine Webber Jackson & Curtis had become a significant participant in the New England financial market.

=== 1960s and 1970s ===
The firm, now known as Paine Webber Jackson & Curtis moved its headquarters from Boston to New York in 1963. The firm's holding company was incorporated in 1970 as PaineWebber Inc., of which Paine Webber Jackson & Curtis was its main subsidiary.

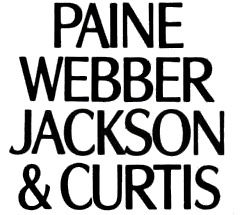
Paine, Webber, Jackson & Curtis logo ca. 1968

In 1974, the firm completed an initial public offering of the stock of its holding company, PaineWebber Inc., and listed the company on the New York Stock Exchange. As was the case for many firms, the company engaged in a number of acquisitions in the 1970s, as a wave of consolidation spread through the industry.

In 1977, the firm acquired investment research and advisory firm Mitchell Hutchins and two years later, in 1979, the company acquired Blyth, Eastman Dillon & Co., which itself was the product of a number of mergers.

=== End of the Jackson & Curtis name ===
By 1980 Paine Webber Jackson & Curtis had 161 branch offices in 42 states and six offices in Asia and Europe. As the company expanded, it was looking to streamline the various brands. The company would consolidate its three divisions, Paine Webber Jackson & Curtis, Paine Webber Mitchell Hutchins and Blyth Eastman Paine Webber Inc., to form Paine Webber Inc. in 1984. After this point, the company would operate under the Paine Webber brand.

In 2000, Paine Webber was acquired by UBS AG, a banking conglomerate headquartered in Zurich, Switzerland.
