= Martin Fridson =

American author (born 1952)

- Born: September 4, 1952 (age 74); Michigan
- Education: Harvard University (BA - History cum laude), 1974; Harvard Business School (M.B.A.), 1976
- Known for: High Yield Investment Research, Inventing a well accepted criterion for distressed debt - simply it is debt that is trading over 1000 basis points above treasuries.
- Scientific career
- Fields: Finance, high-yield debt

Martin Steven Fridson (born September 4, 1952, in Highland Park, Michigan) is an American author who writes about finance and political economy. Fridson has been referred to as the "dean of high yield debt."

== Education ==
Fridson earned a B.A. cum laude in history from Harvard University in 1974, and as a result of gaining entrepreneurial work experience with Southwestern Advantage selling books door-to-door during college, was able to attend Harvard Business School the following semester, eventually graduating in 1976 with an MBA. He was also awarded the Chartered Financial Analyst designation in 1982.

== Career ==
Fridson interviewed with Mitchell Hutchins and accepted a position as an electric utility bond trader in 1976. After Mitchell Hutchins was acquired by Paine Webber in 1977 he left with his trading group to Scandinavian Securities, where he worked ultimately as an assistant vice president. In 1980 he went to Paine Webber's Jackson Curtis arm as a vice president in credit research and fixed income investment strategy. In 1981 he joined Salomon Brothers as a vice president.

He left for Morgan Stanley in 1984. He then joined Merrill Lynch in 1989, where he was director of high yield strategy until 2002. While at Merrill Lynch he documented a history of the high yield debt market, which as Fridson says, "was shrouded in myth." In 2002, he left Merrill to found his own firm, FridsonVision LLC. In May 2008, Fridson sold Leverage World and Distressed Debt Investor, the two primary research products of FridsonVision, and became the CEO of Fridson Investment Advisors, an investment management company. Following that firm's acquisition by BNP Paribas, he worked as global credit strategist in the bank's asset management subsidiary. In August 2012 he resumed operations under the FridsonVision LLC banner.

He has served as president of the Fixed Income Analysts Society, governor of the Association for Investment Management and Research (now the CFA Institute), and director of the New York Society of Security Analysts. Currently, Fridson serves on the editorial boards of CFA Digest, Journal of Investment Management., and Journal of Fixed Income.

== Awards and recognition ==
- In 2002, the Financial Management Association International named Fridson the Financial Executive of the Year.
- For nine consecutive years through 2002, participants in the Institutional Investor All-America research survey ranked Fridson number-one in his category. The magazine's editors dubbed him "the dean of the high yield bond market."

== Works ==
- High Yield Bonds, 1989
- Financial Statement Analysis, 1991
- Investment Illusions, 1996
- It Was a Very Good Year, 2000
- How to be a Billionaire, 2001
- Think Like a Billionaire, 2003
- Unwarranted Intrusions, 2006
- The Little Book of Picking Top Stocks, 2023

== External links and sources ==
- Martin Fridson's personal website
- Fridson on CNBC's Street Smarts
- Fridson on Forbes TV Network
