= James Cowdon Bradford Sr. =

American businessman (1892–1981)

- Born: November 24, 1892; Nashville, Tennessee, U.S.
- Died: December 14, 1981 (aged 89); Nashville, Tennessee, U.S.
- Education: Montgomery Bell Academy; Vanderbilt University
- Occupation: Businessman
- Spouse: Eleanor Avent
- Children: 1 son, 1 daughter

James Cowdon Bradford Sr. (November 24, 1892 – December 14, 1981) was an American businessman. He was the chairman of Piggly Wiggly from 1924 to 1926, and of chairman of the Life and Casualty Insurance Company of Tennessee from 1934 to 1951. He was the founder of J.C. Bradford & Co. in 1927, and remained a senior partner at the investment bank.

== Early life ==
Bradford was born on November 24, 1892, in Nashville, Tennessee. He grew up in Houma, Louisiana from the age of 10 to live with his mother, née Leonora Bisland, after his father, Alexander Bradford, had died.

Bradford returned to Nashville as a teenager, where he attended Montgomery Bell Academy. He graduated from Vanderbilt University, where he joined the Phi Delta Theta fraternity and played football.

== Career ==
Bradford began his career in 1912, when he worked in insurance for Paul M. Davis. During World War I, he taught service members how to shoot guns at Fort Sill.

Bradford was appointed as the president of Piggly Wiggly in 1923. He served as its chairman from 1924 to 1926. During his tenure, he oversaw over 360 stores all across the U.S., and turned the company around.

Bradford founded J.C. Bradford & Co., an investment bank based in Nashville, in 1927. It was headquartered in Nashville's first skyscraper, the Courtyard Nashville Downtown. Bradford was a senior partner at the firm. He was the first Tennessean to buy a seat on the New York Stock Exchange in 1930, for $400,000. In 1941, he encouraged the management at the NYSE to hire non-New Yorkers in what became known as the "Bradford Plan."

Bradford was the chairman of the Life and Casualty Insurance Company of Tennessee from 1934 to 1951.

== Personal life, death and legacy ==
Bradford married Eleanor Avent. They resided at 530 Belle Meade Boulevard in Belle Meade near Nashville. They had a son, James Cowden Bradford Jr., and a daughter, Eleanor Avent Bradford (later Eleanor Bradford Currie).

Bradford died of cancer on December 14, 1981, at Parkview Hospital in Nashville. His funeral was held at St. George's Episcopal Church in Belle Meade.

J.C. Bradford & Co. was acquired by PaineWebber in 2000, followed by UBS AG.
