= Richard S. Reynolds Sr. =

American businessman

- Born: Richard Samuel Reynolds; August 15, 1881; Bristol, Tennessee, U.S.
- Died: July 29, 1955 (aged 73); Richmond, Virginia, U.S.
- Burial place: Hollywood Cemetery
- Education: King University; University of Virginia
- Occupation: Businessman
- Known for: Founder of U.S. Foil Company
- Spouse: Julia Louise Parham (m. 1904)
- Children: 4, including R. S. Jr. and David
- Relatives: R. J. Reynolds (uncle)

Richard Samuel Reynolds Sr. founded the U.S. Foil Company.

== Early life ==
Reynolds was born on August 15, 1881, in Madison County, North Carolina. He was the nephew of leading tobacco producer R. J. Reynolds and the son of Major Abraham David Reynolds (August 13, 1847 – September 1925). He attended King College and graduated with a BA in 1901. He married Julia Louise Parham on December 21, 1904. Reynolds was the father of Richard S. Reynolds Jr. (1908–1980), who was the founder of Reynolds & Co., a brokerage firm that merged with Dean Witter & Co. in 1978 to form Dean Witter Reynolds.

== Career ==
Reynolds left the University of Virginia in 1903 to join the R. J. Reynolds Tobacco Company, working for his uncle, who had founded the company. Reynolds was in part responsible for the company's switch from the production of chewing to smoking tobacco and the launch of Camel cigarettes. In 1912, Reynolds left R. J. Reynolds to go into business for himself.

Shortly after World War I, Reynolds founded the U.S. Foil Company in Louisville, Kentucky. Among the company's early partners were R. J. Reynolds and the British-American Tobacco Company. The company's original business was to roll tin and lead foil for cigarette packaging. Among other innovations, Reynolds devised a moisture-preserving tobacco tin.

Later the switch to aluminum foil was made. In 1947, his company introduced Reynolds Wrap. Reynolds Metals was the second-largest aluminum company in the United States and the third-largest in the world. The Richmond, Virginia, company was bought by ALCOA in 2000.
