= Reynolds Securities =

American brokerage firm

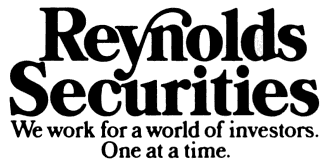
- Company type: Public
- Industry: Financial services
- Founded: 1931; 95 years ago
- Founder: Richard S. Reynolds Jr.
- Defunct: 1978; 48 years ago
- Fate: Assets Acquired By Dean Witter & Co.
- Headquarters: New York City, U.S.
- Products: Brokerage

Reynolds Securities was a publicly traded brokerage firm. Founded in 1931 by Richard S. Reynolds Jr., the firm merged with Dean Witter & Co. to form Dean Witter Reynolds Organization Inc. in 1978, which was then the biggest merger in the history of Wall Street.

The firm's tagline, "We work for a world of investors. One at a time." was adapted to "We measure success one investor at a time" and was used by Dean Witter and later Morgan Stanley.

== History ==
Reynolds & Company was founded in 1931 in New York City by Richard S. Reynolds Jr., a 22-year-old tobacco heir, together with Charles H. Babcock and Thomas F. Staley. In particular, Thomas F. Staley was Reynolds’ cousin (the grandson of Major D. Reynolds, an older brother of R.J. Reynolds). In 1951, another senior partner, John D. Baker, joined the company.

Richard S. Reynolds' father Richard S. Reynolds, Sr. founded U.S. Foil Company, later Reynolds Metals (Reynolds wrap), and his great uncle was the founder of R. J. Reynolds Tobacco Company (RJR).

Like Dean Witter & Co., the company survived the Depression, generating a profit each year. In 1934, Reynolds acquired F.A. Willard & Co. With the acquisition, Reynolds tripled its sales and shifted its emphasis toward underwritings.

In 1958, Reynolds passed its leadership to the next generation with Thomas F. Staley departing and naming Robert M. Gardiner to head the firm. Under Gardiner, Reynolds embarks on major expansion, acquiring 26 offices from A.M. Kidder & Co. Reynolds acquired another three offices and opened nine firms in new regions in the U.S. in the early 1960s.

Reynolds was incorporated in 1971 as Reynolds Securities in advance of an initial public offering. By early 1971, there was speculation that Merrill Lynch would sell shares to the public. Reynolds initial public offering (and shortly thereafter Dean Witter's IPO) was part of a rush of Wall Street firms to sell an interest in their privately held businesses to public investors, following Merrill Lynch's initial public offering. In 1976, Reynolds implements REYCOM, the most sophisticated high-speed wire system in the industry. Meanwhile, the firm was continuing its expansion, acquiring its first international offices in Lugano and Lausanne, Switzerland. A year later, Reynolds acquired Baker Weeks & Co. whose strength was securities research.

At the time of its merger with Dean Witter & Co. in 1978, Reynolds Securities had over 3,100 employees in 72 offices producing gross revenues of nearly $120 million.

== See also ==
- Dean Witter Reynolds
