= David P. Reynolds =

Former chairman of Reynolds Metal

- Born: David Parham Reynolds; June 16, 1915; Bristol, Tennessee, U.S.
- Died: August 29, 2011 (aged 96); Richmond, Virginia, U.S.
- Burial place: Hollywood Cemetery
- Education: Princeton University (BA)
- Occupations: Businessman; horse breeder; environmentalist
- Title: Chairman & CEO, Reynolds Metals, Eskimo Pie Company
- Board member of: Reynolds Metals Co., Robertshaw Controls Co., Commercial Solvents Corp., National Alliance of Businessmen
- Spouse: Margaret Trezevant Harrison (m. 1921; died 1992)
- Children: 3
- Parents: R. S. Reynolds Sr.; Julia Parham Reynolds
- Relatives: R. S. Reynolds Jr. (brother)

David Parham Reynolds (June 16, 1915 – August 29, 2011) was chairman emeritus of Reynolds Metals Co. and an owner/breeder of Thoroughbred racehorses. He was the son of Richard S. Reynolds Sr. (1881–1955) who founded Reynolds Metals in Louisville, Kentucky.

== Early life and family ==
=== Childhood and education ===
Born in Bristol, Tennessee, Reynolds received his high school education at Lawrenceville School, where he captained the prep school's football team. He went on to graduate in 1938 from Princeton University, where he majored in psychology.

=== Marriage and children ===
Reynolds married the former Margaret Trezevant Harrison (1921‍–‍1992), a daughter of William B. Harrison, in 1944. Together, they had three daughters: Margaret Allis, Julia Parham, and Dorothy Harrison.

== Business career ==
After graduating from Princeton, Reynolds would join the family business, where he worked for more than fifty years. He followed his elder brother, Richard S. Reynolds Jr., as president, becoming the last member of his family to head the Richmond, Virginia-based company. In 1986, at age seventy, he stepped down as president but remained chairman of the board of directors.

In 1963, David Reynolds launched the Reynolds Company's production of the country's first all-aluminum beer cans. Because of the light-weight material, compared to the previous steel cans, this innovation became a great success for the company and has dominated the market ever since.

== Thoroughbred horse racing ==
Reynolds became interested in Thoroughbred horse racing and notably owned and bred sprint horse Lord Carson, a multiple stakes race winner who equaled the track record for 6 furlongs at both Churchill Downs and Turfway Park. However, his most famous horse was Tabasco Cat, owned and bred in partnership with Overbrook Farm. In 1994, the colt won two of the three U.S. Triple Crown races, capturing the Preakness and Belmont Stakes.

== Recognition ==
Among Reynolds's awards and honors were the Keep America Beautiful Lifetime Achievement Award, the College of William & Mary's Business Medallion, and the Science Museum of Virginia's Life Achievement Award.
