= Charles R. Blyth =

American investment banker (1883–1959)

- Born: July 31, 1883; Ohio, U.S.
- Died: August 25, 1959 (aged 76); Hillsborough, California
- Education: Amherst College
- Spouses: Marjorie Ramsay and Katherine Ramsay
- Children: 4

Charles R. Blyth (July 31, 1883 – August 25, 1959) was an investment banker, a co-founder of Blyth, Witter & Co., the first investment bank in the Western United States, which later became Blyth, Eastman Dillon & Co. He was a patron of the arts and a political fund raiser.

== Early life ==
Blyth was born in Ohio, and in 1905 he graduated from Amherst College in Massachusetts. In 1908, he moved to California. In 1922, Blyth returned briefly to the East Coast to serve as a pallbearer at the funeral for Amherst's president George Harris.

== Investment ==
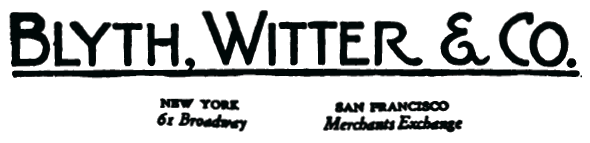
Blyth Witter was founded in 1914.

Blyth worked for financier Louis Sloss & Co. in 1910, where he met coworker Dean G. Witter. The Federal Reserve Act of December 1913 made Sloss unprofitable, and the company filed bankruptcy on April 1, 1914. One week later, Witter and Blyth formed the investment banking partnership Blyth Witter & Co., and asked other Sloss coworkers George Leib and Roy Shurtleff to join them as partners. Blyth, Witter and Shurtleff each owned two shares in the company, at $100 per share. Sloss colleague John D. "Jack" Hartigan was hired as an employee, to sell bonds. The company's young file clerk, Frank Weeden, would later pioneer the "Third market" of over-the-counter trading. The initial funding was composed of $50,000 loaned from the Bank of California, $10,000 loaned from Witter's mother, and whatever price Blyth got for selling his car. Blyth Witter was formally established on April 18, 1914, based out of offices in the Merchants Exchange Building in San Francisco. Sloss aided the new firm with a gift of his office furniture and his customer files.

Blyth Witter initially funded public utilities such as Mt. Whitney Power and Electric. In 1915 the company reformed itself based on $100,000 of capital investment. Blyth and Witter each held 35% of the stock while junior partners each held 10%. Witter's cousin Jean Carter Witter joined the company in 1916 after he graduated from the University of California.

In 1917 when the U.S. entered direct involvement in World War I, a number of Blyth Witter people were commissioned officers in the U.S. Army, including Hartigan, Leib, and both Witters. Blyth was married with children, so he determined to wait for the draft, which passed over him. After the war, Blyth Witter bought $5 million of the stock of Pacific Gas & Electric; an investment that failed to produce a profit but which provided Blyth Witter with a reputation for honesty and steady business sense.

Blyth Witter prospered in the 1920s, expanding with branch offices as distant as Chicago. Blyth Witter financed Holt Manufacturing Company, and helped in the merger Holt and Best to become Caterpillar Inc. Blyth and Witter disagreed about expanding further on the East Coast, so Witter sold his shares back to the company, and with his brother and cousin, formed Dean Witter & Co. Blyth subsequently opened a branch office in London in 1925, and he helped finance the Carquinez Bridge. The Russ Building skyscraper was paid for by Blyth, and when it opened in 1927 the Blyth firm moved its offices there.

In 1928, Blyth bought a seat on the New York Stock Exchange, and was mentioned in The Wall Street Journal for the first time. Roy Shurtleff, newly a millionaire from his Blyth stock, managed the company's offices. Shurtleff was concerned about the branch offices taking too much initiative in buying stocks, so he traveled to each one in 1929, directing the company to sell off a total of $7 million worth of the least promising, most speculative accounts. This action by Shurtleff made the difference for Blyth & Co. in October when the Wall Street crash of 1929 hit—Blyth suffered severe losses but survived.

In the 1930s during the Great Depression, Blyth's business was hurt because far fewer bonds were being offered; companies were not borrowing money. The company's officers greatly reduced their salaries. Still, Blyth was a major source of funding for the Golden Gate Bridge, along with A. P. Giannini of the Bank of America.

== Politics ==
Blyth was an influential supporter of the Republican Party. He financed the political campaign of Earl Warren during his successful 1942 bid to become Governor of California. Blyth expected Warren to allow him to determine the appointments to public utility positions so that the Blyth investment company would be assured of California's bond trade. Warren gave the bond business to a lower bidder, so Blyth subsequently worked to elect Goodwin Knight as Warren's replacement. Knight finally became governor in 1953 when Warren resigned to become Chief Justice of the United States.

== Clubs and society ==
Blyth helped fund America's two great war drives by serving as chairman of the Liberty Loan effort in Northern California during World War I, then in World War II he chaired the Victory Fund Committee. He led the San Francisco chapter of the American Red Cross from 1944 to 1946. Blyth served one term as president of the Burlingame Country Club from 1939 to 1941, and two terms as vice president. He served as president of the Philharmonic Society of San Mateo County; a group that produced a symphony series at the Woodland Amphitheatre. Blyth also served as the vice president of the board of the San Francisco Symphony as well as the San Francisco Opera. Blyth helped raise money for the American Cancer Society, and many other charities. He served as chairman of the California Olympic Commission, formed to produce the 1960 Winter Olympics in Squaw Valley, California. He was a member of the Bohemian Club, the Pacific-Union Club, and other clubs such as the Links Club in New York City. For Stanford University, Blyth served as a trustee, and also as a director of Stanford Research Institute. He was also a trustee of the De Young museum and St. Luke's Hospital, both in San Francisco, and the Mills-Peninsula Hospital in San Mateo.

Blyth was a central figure in the Blyth–Zellerbach Committee, a group of leading San Francisco industrialists who help fund and organize various civic projects and enterprises.

== Personal life ==
Blyth first married the former Marjorie Ramsay in 1915. They had two daughters. Marjorie died in 1923. Two years later he married Marjorie's sister Katharine Ramsay. They had another daughter and a son, Charles R. Blyth Jr.

In 1936, Blyth and his wife bought a house in Hillsborough, California, made for Stanford trustee Joseph Donohoe Grant in 1912. The two-story house, designed in the Italian Renaissance Revival style, was renovated by the Blyths, who reworked the interior. They named the house and property "Strawberry Hill". It was pictured in Life magazine in 1947, showing a formal garden and a swimming pool. Architecturally significant, the house was included in the Historic American Buildings Survey.

In 1940, Blyth quit smoking, and he established a no-smoking policy at his office. Blyth died at Strawberry Hill in August 1959, of heart failure. At his death Blyth had eight grandchildren. His widow Katharine Blyth died May 12, 1975.

== Legacy ==
Because of Blyth's leadership in the early effort to prepare for the 1960 Winter Olympics, Blyth Arena at Squaw Valley was named for him. In 1978, the Blyth family donated $75,000 to Stanford University to establish the Charles R. Blyth Fund, which is an investment fund run by finance students as an educational experience, to let them make real-world decisions with monetary consequences. In 2010, the fund held about $140,000, despite 25% of profits being transferred each year to the university's general fund. The students' investment decisions typically perform better than the S&P 500.
