= George Davidsohn =

George Davidsohn (January 20, 1936 – October 16, 2015) was the founder of Davidsohn Computer Services / BTSI and Davidsohn Global Technologies.

== Early life and career ==
Davidsohn was born in Montevideo; when he was ten, the family moved to New York City where his father worked as a diplomatic consul. At 14, Davidsohn started his career on Wall Street as an IBM punched-card clerk, while attending high school at night. He attended Brooklyn College and the New York Institute of Finance.

== The Davidsohn Group ==
In 1962, Davidsohn developed one of the first computerized post-trade processing systems on Wall Street while working with Dean Witter, helping to automate clearing and settlement operations in the securities industry.

In 1966, he founded Davidsohn Computer Services, an early provider of automated back-office services for brokerage firms.

In 1974 and 1975, the company was acquired by Control Data Corporation and became Brokerage Transaction Services, Inc. (BTSI).

In 1976, Davidsohn founded The Davidsohn Group, through which he continued developing trading, clearing, and settlement systems.

In 2008, the business was renamed Davidsohn Global Technologies, with his son, Joseph Davidsohn, serving as president and chief executive officer.

== Personal life and death ==
George Davidsohn attended the American Academy of Dramatic Arts and took part in several Off-Broadway productions. He was also an avid baseball fan and had a tryout, as a shortstop, for the Brooklyn Dodgers. He and his wife, Denise, had 6 children.

Davidsohn died on October 16, 2015, at the age of 79.
