= Blyth Arena =

Defunct sports venue in Palisades Tahoe, California

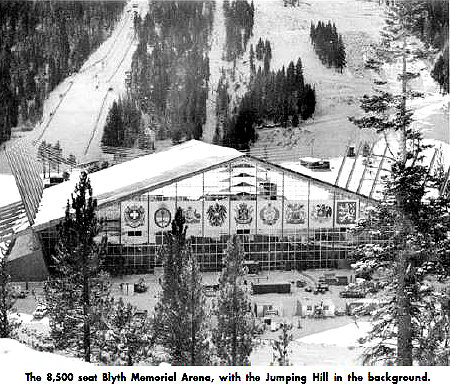
- View from north in 1960
- Interactive map of Blyth Arena
- Location: Squaw Valley, California, U.S.
- Coordinates: 39.1974°N 120.2327°W
- Capacity: 8,500

Construction
- Built: 1959
- Opened: 1960
- Closed: 1983
- Architects: Corlett and Spackman, Kitchen and Hunt
- Structural engineers: John Sardis & Associates, H. J. Brunnier Associates

Blyth Arena was an ice skating arena in the western United States, located at Squaw Valley, California. It was built in 1959 as venue for ice hockey, figure skating competitions, and the opening and closing ceremonies of the 1960 Winter Olympics. With a seating capacity of 8,500, standing-room crowds of 10,000 were reported for the hockey games between the U.S. and the Soviet Union (on the penultimate day) and the U.S.-Czechoslovakia game during the final day. The elevation of the rink was 6,200 feet (1,890 m) above sea level.

Named for Charles R. Blyth, an investment banker who led the California Olympic Commission, Blyth Arena was open on its south side, enabling a view of the mountains. The 400m speed skating track was just to the south of the open side of the arena. This side of the arena also faced the 70m and 90m ski jumps and the slopes of Squaw Valley now known as the Red Dog. Following the Olympics, the wooden ski jump facilities were left unmaintained and slowly deteriorated over time. In 1963, the 400m speed skating track was replaced by a parking lot in spite of protests from California speed skaters; since at the time it was known to be the only mechanically frozen 400m track in the country. From 1963 to 1983, the Squaw Valley ski area operator appealed regularly to the state of California to have the arena torn down to provide additional parking.

== Destruction ==
In 1982, the United States Department of Agriculture made a push for energy conservation. One part of that program was funding to improve insulation on many buildings. The U.S. Forest Service received some of that money to insulate the roof of the arena and the next year the roof collapsed in late March.

What was not appreciated at the time was that the roof was not built to hold much snow, but had survived for 23 years without a problem. The plan had always been that heat generated from the ice chilling equipment in the arena traveled to the ceiling, warmed the uninsulated roof, and melted the snow. With the energy conservation measures in place, the snow did not melt due to waste heat and the building collapsed under the weight. The arena was demolished that year (1983) and the site became additional parking for the ski area.

Although gone, Blyth Arena is remembered as playing a major role in Olympic ice hockey history, and to a lesser extent, in Olympic figure skating history, where the host country won the men's (David Jenkins) and women's (Carol Heiss) individual titles.

In addition to its use by the Olympics, the arena was for several years a site for the Worldwide Church of God's annual Feast of Tabernacles. Evangelists Herbert W. Armstrong and Garner Ted Armstrong spoke at the arena several times during the period that the Feast of Tabernacles was held in Squaw Valley. It should be mentioned that a snowcat was driven onto the roof to clear snow from the roof. The cat was able to drive onto the roof due to the record snow fall in the 82/83 season. The snowcat plowed the snow off of the roof which reduced the snow load. The roof design was a suspension system with steel columns, cables and pulleys that allowed the roof to adjust to changing loads. perhaps the suspension roof system failed due to the sudden and unprecedented travel of the roof once the snow load was removed.

== Replacement ==
There is a new ice arena at High Camp at the top of the cable car tramway, at elevation 8,200 feet (2,500 m). This rink is essentially an outdoor rink which is covered during late spring, summer and early fall. The roof panels are removed for the winter or the wind could potentially remove them. There is a set of Olympic rings hanging at this rink, causing many people to think that the 1960 Olympic figure skating and hockey were conducted on this new ice rink even though there is no seating around the rink nor any way for spectators to have accessed the rink in 1960.
