= Dean G. Witter =

American businessman (1887–1969)

- Born: August 2, 1887; Wausau, Wisconsin, U.S.
- Died: May 25, 1969 (aged 81); Naples, Florida, U.S.
- Education: University of California, Berkeley
- Occupations: Investment banker Stockbroker
- Years active: 1914–1969
- Known for: Founder of Dean Witter Reynolds

Dean Gooding Witter (August 2, 1887 – May 25, 1969) was an American businessman, stockbroker, and investor. With his brother Guy Witter and cousin Jean Witter, Dean Witter co-founded Dean Witter & Company in 1924, which became the largest investment house on the West Coast.

Witter's family moved to Northern California from Wausau, Wisconsin, settling in San Carlos, California, in 1891.

Witter graduated from the University of California, Berkeley, in 1909. At Berkeley, Witter was a member of the Zeta Psi fraternity, and was a distinguished rower. Upon graduation, Witter worked as a salesman for Louis Sloss & Company.

In 1914, Witter partnered with Charles R. Blyth to found Blyth, Witter & Co., a San Francisco-based brokerage. Witter left the partnership to found his own company, Dean Witter & Company, in 1924. With its original offices at 45 Montgomery Street in San Francisco, California, Dean Witter became one of the largest West Coast brokerage firms in the U.S. Among Witter's original partners were his brother Guy and their cousins Jean C. Witter and Ed Witter as well as Fritz Janney.

In its early years, Dean Witter focused on dealing in municipal and corporate bonds. The company was highly successful in its first five years, purchasing a seat on the San Francisco Stock Exchange in 1928 and subsequently opening an office in New York and purchasing a seat on the New York Stock Exchange in 1929. Although a relatively young company, Dean Witter survived the Wall Street crash of 1929 and the Great Depression, posting profits every year during the 1930s and into the 1940s. Dean Witter would lead his company until his death in 1969.
