= J. & W. Seligman & Co. =

American investment banking firm

- Industry: Investment services
- Founded: 1864; 162 years ago
- Founder: Joseph Seligman
- Headquarters: New York City, United States
- Products: Financial services investment banking investment management
- Parent: Ameriprise Financial

J. & W. Seligman & Co., founded in 1864, was a prominent U.S. investment bank from the 1860s to the 1920s, until the divestiture of its investment banking arm in the aftermath of the Glass–Steagall Act. The firm was involved in the financing of several major U.S. railroads in the 1870s and the construction of the Panama Canal in the early 1900s. Seligman was also involved in the formation of Standard Oil and General Motors.

The firm was acquired by Ameriprise Financial in November 2008. Today, the firm operates an investment management business under the Seligman Investments brand. Seligman provides separately managed accounts and retirement services and also operates a series of mutual funds.

== History ==
=== Establishment and early history ===
The firm was founded by Joseph Seligman and his brother James Seligman in New York in 1846 as an importing house, with their younger brothers, William, Jesse, Henry and Leopold, also participating in the venture. Later, two other brothers, Abraham and Isaac, would also join the firm. The brothers were all born in Baiersdorf, Bavaria, to David Seligman and Fannie Steinhart. In 1850, William, Jesse, Henry and Leopold moved to San Francisco, where they set up a store in 1851. After eight years, Jesse and William returned to New York and opened a dry goods store in the city. Through William's efforts, the store received government contracts to supply soldier's uniforms for the Union Army in the American Civil War. These contracts amounted to several millions of dollars. A portion of the payment for the uniforms was in the form of federally issued government debt which the Seligmans had to find buyers for to get immediate cash for operations.

After the American Civil War ended, the eight Seligman brothers decided to go into the banking business and a year later, Jesse Seligman went to Frankfurt, Hesse-Nassau, to open a bank, where they were the first American banking firm to sell United States Government bonds in Europe. The firm became fiscal agent for the conversion of existing war bonds to new ones and acted for years as fiscal agents for the Department of State and Department of the Navy. Soon after, Abraham Seligman opened a bank in New York City, followed by the London branch, established by Isaac and Leopold Seligman, and the Paris branch, established by William Seligman.

In the post-Civil War robber baron era, the firm invested heavily in railroad finance, in particular acting as broker of transactions engineered by Jay Gould. Among the companies in the Seligman portfolio were The Missouri Pacific, the Atlantic and Pacific, the South Pacific, and the Missouri–Kansas–Texas railroad companies. Later, in 1876, the Seligmans joined forces with the Vanderbilt family to create public utilities in New York.

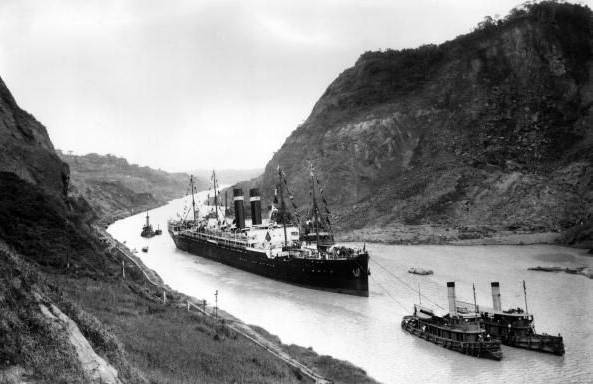
The Seligmans financed the construction of the Panama Canal.

The eight Seligman brothers produced 36 sons, but only Isaac Newton Seligman, Joseph's second son, assumed a leadership role, becoming head of the firm in 1894. In the 19th century, the U.S. partnership of J.& W. Seligman & Co. Inc. had affiliates in Paris, Frankfurt and elsewhere. These entities became independent in 1897. The London partnership, Seligman Bros., was bought by S. G. Warburg & Co. in 1957.

=== 20th century ===
In the early 20th century, the firm backed the construction of the Panama Canal. In this period, J.& W. Seligman & Co. Inc. underwrote the securities of a variety of companies, participating in stock and bond issues in the railroad and steel and wire industries, investments in Russia and Peru, the formation of the Standard Oil Company, and shipbuilding, bridges, bicycles, mining, and a variety of other industries. The landmark building at 1 William Street in New York City was constructed for J.& W. Seligman from 1904 to 1905 and became the firm's home office. In 1910, William C. Durant of the fledgling General Motors Corporation gave control of his company's board to the Seligmans and Lee, Higginson & Co. in return for underwriting $15 million worth of corporate notes.

From 1927 to 1929, Seligman owned a controlling interest in the Victor Talking Machine Company, which it bought from its founder, Eldridge Johnson. Speyer & Company partnered with Seligman in the transaction. Two years later, the company was sold to Radio Corporation of America.

In 1930, Seligman began managing its first mutual fund, Broad Street Investing Co., later known as the Seligman Common Stock Fund. Meanwhile, the firm's investment banking business declined by the 1930s. In 1938, in response to the Glass–Steagall Act, the firm spun off its securities underwriting business as Union Securities. Union Securities was bought by securities broker Eastman Dillon & Co. in 1956 to form Eastman Dillon Union Securities & Co. In 1979, Eastman Dillon (later Blyth, Eastman Dillon & Co.) was acquired by securities broker Paine Webber, which in 2000 became part of financial conglomerate UBS AG. Parts of J.& W. Seligman & Co. Inc. continue as a closed-end investment company, Tri-Continental Corporation (NYSE: TY) (established in 1929), and as Seligman mutual funds.

From 1940 to 1974 J. & W. Seligman & Co. was headquartered at the American Express Company Building in the Financial District of Manhattan, New York City.

In 1980, Seligman, which had been owned by its employees in a partnership, restructured into a private corporation, owned by 43 employees. In 1989, the company was acquired through a $52.6 million management buyout, led by a number of its directors, most notably William C. Morris, formerly of Shearson Lehman/American Express. The buyout was financed by a consortium of insurance companies.

In 1991, Seligman entered into a joint venture with Henderson plc, one of Europe's largest independent money managers. The venture, known as Seligman Henderson Co., was designed to provide the firm with a more global reach than it had achieved on its own. The firm left behind its downtown offices at 130 Liberty Street and moved to new offices on Park Avenue in 1993. Seligman focused its efforts on institutional investors after selling its high-net-worth business to U.S. Trust Corp. in 1995. In 1997, Seligman began offering its first offshore mutual funds, Seligman Global Horizon Funds, to non-US investors.

Seligman experienced significant growth in the 1990s. The Seligman Communication & Information Fund, managed by Paul Wick, was among the best performing of the mid-1990s, while its mainstay fund Tri-Continental Corporation had languished with poor performance during the bull market. However, the collapse of the internet bubble heavily impacted Seligman. The firm's Communication & Information Fund, which had been a high flier in the 1990s, lost nearly half of the $11 billion of assets it had at the peak in March 2000.

=== 21st century ===
In 2001, the company launched the first of three successful hedge funds, Seligman Tech Spectrum Fund, soon to be followed by Seligman Health Spectrum and market neutral Seligman Spectrum Focus. By the end of 2007, the firm was managing over $3Bn in hedge fund assets.

In November 2008, Ameriprise Financial acquired J. & W. Seligman & Co. Incorporated for total consideration of $440 million. Today, the company’s hedge fund business operates under the brand name Seligman Investments, while the mutual funds are part of the Columbia Threadneedle family of funds.
