= Richard S. Reynolds Jr. =

American businessman (1908–1980)

- Born: Richard Samuel Reynolds Jr. May 27, 1908; Winston-Salem, North Carolina, United States
- Died: October 5, 1980 (aged 72); Richmond, Virginia, United States
- Burial place: Reynolds Homestead
- Education: Davidson College; University of Pennsylvania
- Occupation: Businessman
- Spouse: Virginia McDonald Sargeant (m. 1933)
- Children: Richard S. III; J. Sargeant
- Father: Richard S. Reynolds Sr.
- Relatives: David P. Reynolds (brother); R. J. Reynolds (grand-uncle)

Richard Samuel Reynolds Jr. (May 27, 1908 – October 5, 1980) was an American businessman. The son of Richard S. Reynolds Sr., he founded Reynolds Securities before succeeding his father as the president of Reynolds Metals Company.
