= Pactiv Evergreen =

American packaging company

Pactiv Evergreen Inc.
- Company type: Subsidiary
- Industry: Packaging and Container Manufacturing
- Predecessor: Reynolds Group Holdings
- Founded: 2020; 6 years ago
- Headquarters: Lake Forest, Illinois, U.S.
- Key people: Mike King (CEO)
- Products: Custom and stock foam, plastic, aluminum, pressed-paperboard, PE coated board, and molded-fiber packaging
- Revenue: ▲$5.437 billion (2021)
- Operating income: ▼$108 million (2021)
- Net income: ▲$23 million (2021)
- Total assets: ▲$7.021 billion (2021)
- Total equity: ▲$1.288 billion (2021)
- Number of employees: 16,500
- Parent: Novolex
- Subsidiaries: Pactiv LLC; Evergreen Packaging; Fabri-Kal

Pactiv Evergeen Inc. was a manufacturer and distributor of food packaging and foodservice products, supplying packers, processors, supermarkets, restaurants, institutions and foodservice outlets across North America. The company operates as a unit of Novolex.

In April 2025, Novolex completed the purchase of the company for $6.7 billion.

== Operations ==
Pactiv Evergreen operations are divided into three segments: Foodservice, Food Merchandising, and Beverage Merchandising. The company operates 53 manufacturing plants, 26 warehouses, and 8 distribution centers.

== History ==
Pactiv Evergreen was created in 2020 through the initial public offering of Reynolds Group Holdings Limited (RGHL). Both Pactiv and Evergreen Packaging were predecessor companies previously acquired to become part of Reynolds Group Holdings.

Pactiv’s roots stretch back to 1959, when Central Fibre, American Boxboard, and Ohio Boxboard merged to form Packaging Corporation of America (PCA). Those companies bear little resemblance to the company today, as they operated paper mills that exclusively produced cardboard boxes.

Tenneco Inc. purchased PCA in 1965, and during the next 34 years the company undertook a number of acquisitions, including the acquisition of Mobil Plastics Company in 1995 and Amoco Foam Products Company in 1996, which formed the basis of the current Pactiv business. As a result, its product portfolio expanded to include aluminum, clear plastic, foam products, molded fiber and pressware. The company name changed numerous times, from PCA to Tenneco Packaging Inc. (1995) to Pactiv Corporation (1999), when it was spun off by Tenneco, becoming an independent company. Since 1999, the company pursued a number of strategic mergers and acquisitions, each with an eye toward strengthening its position in the foodservice packaging industry, including adding Jaguar (2002), Newspring (2005), Prairie Packaging (2007), and PWP Industries (2010).

In 2010, Pactiv was acquired by Rank Group Ltd, and became part of Reynolds Group Holdings Limited (RGHL), a global manufacturer and supplier of consumer food and beverage packaging and storage products. Since the Rank acquisition, the company continued to grow, incorporating the legacy Reynolds Foodservice business to Pactiv, acquiring Dopaco in 2011, adding International Tray Pads and Packaging, Interplast Packaging in 2012, and Spirit, a manufacturer of foodservice products including cups, cutlery, straws and stirrers, in 2013.

Evergreen Packaging was formed in 2007 when Paper Beverage Packaging Division, Blue Ridge Paper Products, and Cherry-Burrell combined to form a single entity. Evergreen Packaging was acquired by Reynolds Group Holdings Limited in 2010.

On September 8, 2021 it was announced the company will acquire, through its wholly owned subsidiary Pactiv Evergreen Group Holdings, Fabri-Kal a manufacturer of foodservice and consumer brand packaging solutions, for $380 million.

On March 6, 2023, Pactiv Evergreen announced the Canton, North Carolina, plant would close in the summer, affecting 1,100 workers, and that 160 more employees would lose their jobs in Olmsted Falls, Ohio.

On April 17, 2023, reporting from The New York Times alleged that migrant children were illegally working overnight shifts at a Pactiv Evergreen factory in Illinois.

Charlotte, North Carolina-based Novolex announced the $6.7 billion purchase of Pactiv Evergreen on December 9, 2024. The deal closed in April 2025.
