= J.C. Bradford & Co. =

American financial services firm

- Type: Private
- Industry: Financial services
- Founded: 1927
- Founder: James Cowdon Bradford Sr.
- Defunct: 2000
- Fate: Acquired by PaineWebber (later UBS AG)
- Headquarters: Nashville, Tennessee, United States; 81 offices in 14 states
- Products: Investment banking, Brokerage
- Number of employees: 2,400

J.C. Bradford & Co. was a Nashville-based investment banking and brokerage firm founded by James Cowdon Bradford Sr. in 1927. The firm was the first from Nashville to buy a seat on the New York Stock Exchange.

The firm was acquired by PaineWebber in April 2000 for $620 million to gain access to its network of 900 brokers. Just a month after the acquisition, PaineWebber announced the closure of the investment banking unit of J.C. Bradford & Co. in May 2000. Soon after, PaineWebber was acquired by Swiss banking firm UBS AG.

Prior to its acquisition, the firm had 2,400 employees in 81 offices located in 14 states, focused primarily in the southern United States.

== History ==
=== Founding through 1973 ===
J.C. Bradford & Co. was founded in May 1927, when Bradford purchased Joe B. Palmer Co., a small securities firm in Nashville, for $10,000. Before founding J.C. Bradford & Co., Bradford had worked in insurance, managing the Davis, Bradford & Company insurance agency until 1923 when he was brought in to save the Memphis-based grocery store Piggly Wiggly. Bradford served as president of the grocery retailer from 1923 to 1926. Bradford led the company's corporate restructuring after its founder had nearly bankrupted the company in an effort to corner the market for the company's common stock.

Despite the stock market crash of 1929, in 1930 J.C. Bradford & Co. purchased its seat on the New York Stock Exchange for $400,000. By 1940, the value of this seat was estimated to be approximately $19,000.

Following the end of World War II, the firm expanded into new markets throughout Tennessee in 1946, including Memphis and Jackson. Then, in the 1950s, the firm continued to expand, opening offices in New York and Atlanta. In 1966, the firm merged with Elder & Co., based in Chattanooga, Tennessee and then expanded for the first time to the West Coast with an office in La Jolla, California in 1973.

=== 1974−2000 ===
The firm faced another major economic crisis during the 1973–1974 stock market crash, experiencing its first loss since the Great Depression in 1974. During the 1970s, consolidation was rampant among many longstanding Wall Street firms and in 1979 J.C. Bradford chose a merger with Almstead Bros., based in Kentucky and then a year later with Frost, Johnson, Reed and Smith, based in South Carolina.

The following year, in 1981, J. C. Bradford Sr. died leaving his son, J. C. Bradford Jr., who had joined the firm in 1959, to assume the role of senior partner of the firm in 1982. By the end of the 1980s, the firm was growing again, opening seven new offices in five southern states. In 1989, The Bradford Money Fund, a short-term money market fund, was launched. The fund would grow from $280 million in its first year to over $1 billion in 1995 and doubling to $2 billion just three years later in 1998 with over 140,000 clients.

According to The Tennessean, "J.C. Bradford & Co. helped a number of companies in Nashville successfully raise capital, including Shoney's, Amsurg, HCA, Central Parking, Healthways, Corrections Corporation of America, and Ingram Industries."
