= Fabri-Kal =

American company

- Type: Subsidiary
- Industry: Plastics
- Founded: 1950
- Founder: Robert P. Kittredge
- Headquarters: Kalamazoo, Michigan
- Number of locations: 4 production facilities
- Products: Plastic cups & containers
- Parent: Pactiv Evergreen
- Website: http://www.fabri-kal.com

Fabri-Kal is a United States company. It is a provider of plastic foodservice and custom thermoformed packaging. Products include consumer and foodservice products including plastic cups, containers and lids. It is headquartered in Kalamazoo, Michigan. Fabri-Kal specializes in materials including PP, PET, PCR-PET, HDPE, PLA, renewable agricultural pulp and HIPS.

== Company history ==
Fabri-Kal Corporation was founded in Kalamazoo, Michigan in 1950 when seven investors purchased the plastic segment of the Kalamazoo Paper Box Company. The owners decided to call the new business Fabri-Kal, a portmanteau of "fabricated in Kalamazoo".

Located in downtown Kalamazoo, their initial 5,000 square foot operation began in a former A&P grocery store. The company built a 25,000 square foot manufacturing facility on East Cork Street in Kalamazoo, which was followed in 1961 by a second manufacturing facility in Hazleton, Pennsylvania.

As the company continued to grow, the Fabri-Kal Foundation was established in 1969 to provide higher-education tuition assistance to young-adult children of all employees. In 1981 a new headquarters building was constructed in Kalamazoo and a third manufacturing facility opened in Piedmont, South Carolina.

In 1991 the Kalamazoo manufacturing facility closed its doors, leaving all manufacturing capacity outside of Michigan. The company was able to overcome its hardships and purchased a 400,000 square foot building in 2008 and after a two year renovation once again opened their doors. In 2010 the Kalamazoo manufacturing facility was awarded the LEED® Silver certification.

On October 15, 2015, Fabri-Kal held the grand opening for their new 100,000 square foot manufacturing facility in Burley, Idaho employing approximately 50 people with an additional 100 people planned in the next five years.

On October 1, 2021, it was announced that Pactiv acquired the company through its wholly owned subsidiary Pactiv Evergreen Group Holdings, for $380 million.

== Product lines ==
- Greenware cold drink cups and portion cups
- Kal-Clear PET drink cups
- Nexclear polypropylene drink cups
- RK translucent drink cups
- Kids cups
- Juice cups
- Portion cups
- Alur round containers
- Indulge dessert containers
- Pro-Kal deli containers
- Microwavable bowls
- Mushroom tills
- Produce clamshells
- Lids

== Greenware ==
Fabri-Kal produces sustainable Greenware cold drink cups, lids and portion cups made entirely from plants, not petroleum. All Greenware products are 100% made in the U.S.A.
