= Union Securities =

American investment banking firm

- Type: Acquired
- Industry: Investment bank
- Predecessor: J. & W. Seligman & Co.
- Founded: 1938 (spin-out)
- Fate: Merged with Eastman, Dillon & Co., ultimately part of UBS AG
- Headquarters: New York City, United States

Union Securities Corporation was an independent investment banking firm in existence from 1938 through its acquisition in 1956, although the name would survive through 1972. Union Securities was created in 1938 as a spinoff of the investment banking operations of J. & W. Seligman & Co. as a result of the Glass-Steagall Act.

In 1956, the firm merged with Eastman Dillon & Co. The Union Securities name remained until 1972, when what was then known as Eastman Dillon Union Securities merged with Blyth & Co. to form Blyth, Eastman Dillon & Co. That firm was later acquired by Paine Webber, which is today a part of UBS

== History ==
The firm's predecessor, J. & W. Seligman & Co. was founded as an importing house by Joseph Seligman and his brothers in New York in 1846. After the American Civil War ended, the Seligman brothers decided to go into the banking business and a year later, Jesse Seligman went to Frankfurt, Germany, to open a bank, where they were the first American banking firm to sell United States Government bonds in Europe. In the post-Civil War robber baron era, the firm invested heavily in railroad finance, in particular acting as broker of transactions engineered by Jay Gould. Later, in 1876, the Seligmans joined forces with the Vanderbilt family to create public utilities in New York.

In the early 20th century, the firm's predecessor backed the construction of the Panama Canal. In this period, J.& W. Seligman & Co. Inc. underwrote the securities of a variety of companies, participating in stock and bond issues in the railroad and steel and wire industries, investments in Russia and Peru, the formation of the Standard Oil Company, and shipbuilding, bridges, bicycles, mining, and a variety of other industries. In 1910, William C. Durant of the fledgling General Motors Corporation gave control of his company's board to the Seligmans and Lee, Higginson & Co. in return for underwriting $15 million worth of corporate notes.

However, by the 1930s, Seligman's investment banking business was declining. In 1938, in response to the Glass-Steagall Act, the firm spun off its securities underwriting business as Union Securities. The firm was formed with $1 million of cash and an additional $4 million of unfunded subscriptions. Union Securities established a successful track record during the 1940s and 1950s in as a merchant banking firm, focusing on acquiring and restructuring companies.

Union Securities merged with securities broker Eastman Dillon & Co. in 1956 to form Eastman Dillon Union Securities & Co. The combined firm had assets of more than $17 million and had completed more than $770 million in underwriting of corporate issues and municipal bonds since the beginning of 1955. An intermediate financing portion of the business was not sold in the merger, and that business was renamed Tri-Continental Financial Corporation. In 1979, Eastman Dillon (later Blyth, Eastman Dillon & Co.) was acquired by securities broker Paine Webber, which in 2000 became part of financial conglomerate UBS AG.
