= Greenware (computing) =

Software license

Greenware is software distributed under the condition that the user does something to help the environment. The term "greenware" is a variant on shareware and freeware. Greenware can be distributed free or for charge. In either case the author expects the user to do something "green". Examples of this include planting trees, switching to a cleaner car, or quitting smoking.

A more general approach than greenware is careware, which distributes software in a way that benefits a charity.

Greenware can also refer to a combination of computer hardware, software and services, which enables user to minimize the environmental footprint of using the computer and lower TCO (Total Cost of Ownership) at the same time.
