= Blyth, Eastman Dillon & Co. =

American investment banking firm

- Company type: Acquired
- Industry: Investment bank
- Predecessor: Blyth, Witter & Co. Union Securities; Eastman Dillon & Co.
- Founded: 1914
- Fate: Merged with Paine Webber, ultimately part of UBS AG
- Headquarters: New York City, United States
- Number of employees: 700

Blyth, Eastman Dillon & Co. (Blyth Eastman or BEDCO) was an American investment bank founded in 1914. Blyth Eastman operated for many years as one of the few major investment banking firms on the West Coast of the U.S. At the time of its acquisition, Blyth Eastman had more than 700 finance related employees with over 70 branch offices across the U.S. Blyth Eastman was among the top ten largest investment banks at the time of its acquisition.

Blyth Eastman was a leader in block trading, institutional investing, commodities brokering, and OTC trades. The firm also had a strong corporate banking business.

The firm was merged with Paine Webber in 1979, which was later acquired by UBS AG.

== History ==
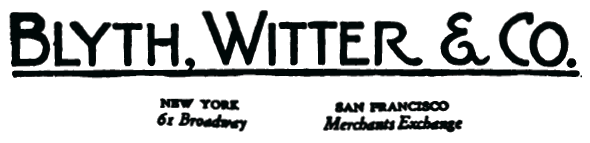
Blyth Witter & Co., the firm's predecessor was founded in 1914 by Charles Blyth and Dean G. Witter

=== Founding and early history ===
The firm was founded in San Francisco, California in 1914 by Charles R. Blyth and Dean G. Witter. Originally known as Blyth, Witter & Co., the firm was renamed Blyth & Co. in 1924, when Witter left to set up his own brokerage business, Dean Witter & Co.

In 1935, Charles Mitchell, former chairman of the National City Bank of New York and a director of the Federal Reserve Bank of New York, joined what was then Blyth & Co. to assist in developing its underwriting and distribution businesses, which were intended to complement the company's West Coast investment banking operation.

=== Consolidation and acquisition ===
In 1970, Blyth was sold for $55 million to Insurance Company of North America, in what was at the time an unusual acquisition by a company outside of the investment banking industry.

Two years later, Blyth & Co. merged with Eastman Dillon Union Securities & Co. in 1972, which itself was the product of the 1956 merger of Union Securities and Eastman Dillon & Co. Eastman Dillon had been a full-time investment banking firm, founded in Pennsylvania in 1912 by Herbert Dillon and Thomas Eastman. Union Securities had formerly been the investment banking operations of J. & W. Seligman & Co., and was established in 1939, in the aftermath of the Glass–Steagall Act's separation of banking and underwriting activities. Eastman Dillon Union Securities & Co. established a successful track record during the 1940s and 1950s in as a merchant banking firm, focusing on acquiring and restructuring companies.

In 1979, Blyth, Eastman, Dillon & Co. merged with Paine Webber to form Blyth Eastman, Paine Webber. The merger would prove difficult for the combined company which struggled to integrate Blyth Eastman's investment banking operations with Paine Webber's retail business. This merger never fully achieved the intended goal of turning Paine Webber into a major investment banking house. In 1984, a reorganization of the company combined the three subsidiaries, Paine, Webber, Jackson & Curtis; Blyth Eastman Paine Webber; and PaineWebber Mitchell Hutchins, under one name, PaineWebber Incorporated, resulting in the disappearance of the Blyth Eastman brand. Paine Webber was acquired by UBS AG in 2000.
