= Mitchell Hutchins =

Former securities research firm in New York City

Mitchell, Hutchins & Co.
- Industry: Financial services
- Founded: June 21, 1919; 107 years ago
- Defunct: May 27, 1977; 49 years ago
- Fate: Acquired by Paine Webber

Mitchell, Hutchins & Co. was a securities research firm based in New York City. In 1977, it was acquired by Paine Webber.

== History ==
The firm was founded in 1919 in Chicago, Illinois, by William H. Mitchell and James C. Hutchins, Jr. Both were members of two prominent Chicago banking families involved with the Illinois Bank & Trust. The firm's first officers were W. Edwin Stanley (president), Hutchins, J. Ogden Armour, Chauncey Keep, Charles Garfield King (vice presidents), Robert A. Gardner (treasurer), and Mitchell (secretary). Its first stockholders included John J. Mitchell William Wrigley Jr. and Albert Lasker.

In 1965, the company acquired D.B. Marron & Company, founded in 1959 by Donald Marron. In 1967, Marron was named president of the company. Under Marron, the firm's prominence grew significantly.

In 1975, the firm was chosen as the best research firm on Wall Street by portfolio managers.

In 1977, Mitchell Hutchins was acquired by Paine Webber. Paine Webber continued to use the Mitchell Hutchins brand until the company was acquired by UBS in 2000.

In 2001, Mitchell Hutchins was merged into Brinson Partners.
