= Reynolds Group Holdings =

American aluminium producer

- Type: Private
- Industry: Packaging
- Predecessor: Reynolds Metal Company (acquired by Alcoa - 2000)
- Founded: 1919; 107 years ago in Louisville, Kentucky, U.S.
- Defunct: 2020; 6 years ago
- Successor: Pactiv Evergreen; Reynolds Consumer Products
- Headquarters: Auckland, New Zealand
- Products: Aluminum foil
- Website: www.reynoldsgroupholdings.com

Reynolds Group Holdings was a New Zealand–based packaging company with roots in the former Reynolds Metals Company, which was the second-largest aluminum company in the United States, and the third-largest in the world. Reynolds Metals was acquired by Alcoa in June 2000. Reynolds Group Holdings became Pactiv Evergreen through an IPO in 2020.

Reynolds Metals became known for the consumer product Reynolds Wrap foil, as well as for developing and promoting new uses for aluminum. Its RV Aluminaut submarine was operated by Reynolds Submarine Services Corporation.

It was headquartered for most of its existence in Richmond, Virginia; the Modernist style Reynolds Metals Company International Headquarters was built there in 1958.

== History ==
The Reynolds Metals Company was founded in 1919 as the U.S. Foil Company in Louisville, Kentucky, by Richard S. Reynolds Sr., nephew of tobacco king R. J. Reynolds. Initially, the new company supplied lead and tin foil wrappers to cigarette and candy companies. In 1924, U.S. Foil purchased the manufacturer of Eskimo Pies, which were wrapped in foil. In 1928, Reynolds purchased Robertshaw Thermostat, Fulton Sylphon, and part of Beechnut Foil, adding them to U.S. Foil to create Reynolds Metals. In 1931, the company moved its headquarters to New York City and in 1938 the headquarters moved again to Richmond, Virginia.

The company began producing aluminum foil for packaging in 1926. Reynolds Metals created the first high-speed, gravure-printed foil, aluminum bottle labels, heat-sealed foil bags for foods and foil-laminated building insulation paper. In 1940, Reynolds Metals began mining bauxite (aluminum ore) in Bauxite, Arkansas, and opened its first aluminum plant near Sheffield, Alabama, the following year. In 1947, the company released Reynolds Wrap Aluminum Foil. Reynolds Metals pioneered the development of aluminum siding in 1945, and Richard S. Reynolds began predicting a growing demand for additional aluminum during peacetime. He believed new aluminum-producing facilities would need to be built to meet demand. Reynolds Metals Company leased, and later bought, six government defense plants that were up for disposal. Reynolds later expanded into non aluminum products such as plastics and precious metals, introducing Reynolds Plastic Wrap in 1982.

After the Second World War, the sense of aluminum's utility expanded to include its ornamental characteristics. By repurposing military by-products into consumer goods, aluminum was now being marketed for its decorative appeal as well, creating a product of both functional and eye-catching qualities. Reynolds advertised aluminum for its multi-faceted property, now reaching areas of fashion, home improvement, and architecture. Reynolds marketed aluminum foil as gift wrap, aluminum yarn for Vogue dress patterns, and even extended their advertising strategy to include wrapping their office headquarters in aluminum.

Four sons of founder Richard S. Reynolds, William G. Reynolds, Richard S. Reynolds Jr., David P. Reynolds, and J. Louis Reynolds, were all part of the running of the business. Richard S. Reynolds Jr. succeeded his father as president in 1948 and under his leadership, the company underwent a major expansion with operations extended to countries around the world such as Venezuela and the Philippines. In 1976 David P. Reynolds, also known for his involvement in Thoroughbred horse racing, took over as president. He was the last member of his family to head the company and would retire as chairman.

Reynolds Metals developed other, less well-known products; not all became commercially viable, such as an aluminum bus developed with Rohr Industries, a 12-foot aluminum utility boat, and other aluminum motor vehicles., The aluminum vehicles were surpassed in weight and cost by steel, plastics and fiberglass. However, when Reynolds Metals developed the world's first aluminum submarine, the Aluminaut, the experimental product participated in a key rescue. In 1969, Aluminaut rescued Alvin (DSV-2). Aluminaut's assistance enabled Woods Hole Oceanographic Institution to continue operating its submersible. Alvin's work continues 45 years later.

By 1991, Reynolds Metals employed 30,800 workers at more than 100 operations in 20 countries, including 64 plants in the United States, and had a total production capacity of more than 1 million tons of aluminum and aluminum products. The company was acquired by Alcoa on May 3, 2000, to become the largest aluminum company in the United States.

On January 21, 2008, Alcoa sold its consumer unit to Rank Group Ltd. Rank's owner, New Zealand billionaire Graeme Hart, renamed Alcoa's former unit the Reynolds Packaging Group. Hart merged his other packaging companies into Reynolds to create Reynolds Group Holdings.

In an initiative led by Paul D. Thomas, Reynolds Packaging Group chief executive officer and a former Alcoa executive, on September 21, 2008, Reynolds announced that one of the foil plants that produced Reynolds Wrap, in downtown Richmond, Virginia, would be closed and foil operations moved to Louisville, Kentucky, where Reynolds Wrap first was produced. A small portion of the spooling operation from the Richmond Foil plant was moved to the Reynolds plant in Grove City, Pennsylvania, in early 2010. Hart later closed five other plants within Reynolds. As a reflection of the recessionary times, salaries were frozen and salaried employees were not given pay raises. Union employees with fixed compensation contracts did receive incentive compensation. In early 2010 all pay was unfrozen. Salaried employees have since received pay adjustments.

== Headquarters ==
The former Reynolds Metals Company International Headquarters building is in Henrico County, Virginia, near Richmond. Built 68 years ago, it is a Modernist building designed by the architect Gordon Bunshaft of Skidmore, Owings & Merrill. During its use by Reynolds, the Executive Office Building was known as Reynolds EXO. In 2000, it was named to the National Register of Historic Places, becoming one of the rare mid−20th century buildings on the list. Making extensive use of aluminum, down to threads in the carpeting, it is now owned by the University of Richmond and serves as the worldwide headquarters of Altria Group.

== Consumer products ==
Reynolds Wrap was first made in 1947 by a Reynolds Metals Company division, Reynolds Packaging, a business created to supply aluminum foil for packaging tobacco. When Alcoa purchased Reynolds Metals, it shed some non-metals packaging and printing businesses but preserved the Reynolds consumer brand, as well as the Reynolds Kitchens, which are still across the street from the former Reynolds headquarters building. Alcoa's Reynolds division was a leader in household baking and cooking products, which included Cut-Rite Wax Paper.

Reynolds published cookbooks such as Outdoor Cooking with Reynolds Wrap (1950) and Casual Cooking (1954) in an attempt to promote the sales of Reynolds Wrap.

In 1958, the company launched the "Designs for Giving" campaign, in which professional artists and designers were hired to create special patterns for aluminum gift wrapping. Designs included "Birds and Bees" for baby showers, "Born Lucky, Born Rich" for birthdays, and "Flight of Fancy" for weddings or Christmas.

Reynolds Consumer Products went public with an initial public offering on NASDAQ under the ticker symbol REYN on Friday, January 31, 2020.
