= Paine Webber =

American investment bank and stock brokerage firm

Paine Webber & Co.
- Type: Public
- Industry: Financial services
- Predecessor: Paine, Webber, Jackson & Curtis (1942–1984); Paine & Webber (1881–1942); Jackson & Curtis (1879–1942)
- Founded: 1881; 145 years ago
- Founders: William A. Paine; Wallace G. Webber
- Defunct: 2000; 26 years ago
- Fate: Acquired in 2000 by UBS
- Successor: UBS Paine Webber, later UBS Wealth Management
- Headquarters: New York City, New York, U.S.
- Products: Brokerage, Investment management, Investment banking

PaineWebber & Co. was an American investment bank and stock brokerage firm that was acquired by the Swiss bank UBS in 2000. The company was founded in 1880 in Boston, Massachusetts, by William A. Paine and Wallace G. Webber. Operating with two employees, they leased premises at 48 Congress Street in May 1881. The company was renamed Paine, Webber & Co. when Charles Hamilton Paine became a partner. Members of the Boston Stock Exchange, in 1890 the company acquired a seat on the New York Stock Exchange. Wallace G. Webber retired after the business weathered a major financial crisis of 1893.

== History ==
=== Founding and early history ===
In May 1881, William Alfred (W.A.) Paine (with a loan from his father) and Wallace G. Webber founded Paine & Webber as a brokerage firm in Boston, Massachusetts with a seat on the Boston Stock Exchange. With the admission of Charles H. Paine to the partnership, the firm was renamed Paine, Webber & Co. The firm would purchase a seat on the New York Stock Exchange in 1890. Also in the 1890s, W.A. Paine entered into a partnership with Copper Range Company and Copper Range Railroad, controlled by John Stanton.

Controlled by the Paine family, Paine, Webber & Co. entered the investment banking business in the 1920s. After nearly fifty years at the head of the company, W.A. Paine died right before the Wall Street crash of 1929. His son F. Ward Paine became head of the firm, a position he held until 1940.

Following the difficult years of the Great Depression, Paine Webber merged with Jackson & Curtis, another Boston-based brokerage firm, in June 1942. In July 1879, Charles Cabot Jackson and Laurence Curtis had founded their brokerage firm Jackson & Curtis on Congress Street in Boston, not far from the original Paine Webber offices. The combined firm, Paine, Webber, Jackson & Curtis, operated a combined total of 22 branch offices. With its greater combined asset base, Paine Webber Jackson & Curtis had become a significant participant in the New England financial market.

=== 1960s and 1970s ===
In October 1960, Paine Webber managed the initial public offering (IPO) of the Green Shoe Manufacturing Co., in which it introduced the concept of stabilization covered by an overallotment option, which has ever since been known by the colloquial name of greenshoe.

The firm moved its headquarters from Boston to New York in 1963. The firm's holding company was incorporated on June 30, 1969, as PaineWebber Inc., of which Paine Webber Jackson & Curtis was its main subsidiary.

In 1974, the firm completed an initial public offering of the stock of its holding company, PaineWebber Inc., and listed the company on the New York Stock Exchange. PaineWebber engaged in a number of acquisitions in the 1970s, as a wave of consolidation spread through the industry. In 1973, the firm acquired F.S. Smithers & Co., providing its first a presence in fixed income. PaineWebber also acquired Abbott, Proctor & Paine in 1970, the Abacus Fund, a closed-end investment company in 1972, Mitchum, Jones & Templeton Inc. in 1973.

In 1977, the firm acquired investment research and advisory firm Mitchell Hutchins, which had been founded in 1919.

In 1979 the company acquired Blyth, Eastman Dillon & Co., which itself was the product of a number of mergers. Among its predecessor firms were Blyth & Co. which had merged with Eastman Dillon Union Securities & Co. in 1972, itself the product of the 1956 merger of Union Securities (formerly the investment banking division of J. & W. Seligman & Co.) and Eastman Dillon & Co. The acquisition added more than 70 branch offices and more than 700 professionals as well as an investment banking business.

=== 1980s ===
By 1980, PaineWebber had 161 branch offices in 42 states and six offices in Asia and Europe. With the acquisition of Rotan Mosle Financial Corp. in 1983, PaineWebber developed a national distribution network and with its advertising campaign "Thank You PaineWebber" developed its brand throughout the 1980s. In 1984, the company consolidated its two divisions, Paine Webber Jackson & Curtis and Blyth Eastman Paine Webber Inc., to form PaineWebber Inc. PaineWebber Group Inc. was established as the parent holding company.

PaineWebber moved its headquarters from 140 Broadway to 1285 Avenue of the Americas in Midtown Manhattan in 1985. PaineWebber became a visible presence on Sixth Avenue. At the time, the illuminated name on the building (today UBS) was unique among investment banks, and the building hosted a ground floor gallery of art exhibitions.

In 1986, the firm opened a new technology and transaction processing operation at Lincoln Harbor in New Jersey.

=== 1990s ===
In 1995, PaineWebber completed the acquisition of the brokerage and investment banking firm Kidder, Peabody & Co. from General Electric Company. Founded in 1865, Kidder, Peabody had been a preeminent player in investment banking and private services before becoming embroiled in insider trading scandals in the 1980s and suffering major trading losses in 1994. Chris Innes served as an Investment Banking analyst from 1992-1994 and later became one of BOFAs youngest Managing directors at age 27 before leaving to launch his own hedge fund (https://www.cnbc.com/2007/01/02/two-senior-executives-leave-bank-of-america.html). During these years Michael G. Ricciardi was the managing director and head of global fixed income sales at Paine Webber.

=== 2000 ===
Operating as PaineWebber Group Inc., by 2000 PaineWebber had emerged as the fourth largest private client firm in the United States with 385 offices employing 8554 stockbrokers.

In April 2000, PaineWebber acquired southeastern brokerage firm J.C. Bradford & Co. for US$620 million. The deal was not profitable for PaineWebber, as a great number of brokers left the firm due to corporate cultural differences, taking their clients with them. The Bradford unit which had been "purchased by PaineWebber mainly for its network of 900 brokers" was closed.

=== Merger with UBS ===
On November 3, 2000, under the leadership of chairman and CEO, Donald Marron, the company completed a US$10.8 billion cash and stock merger with UBS, a banking conglomerate headquartered in Zurich, Switzerland. Initially the business was given the divisional name "UBS PaineWebber", but in 2003, the 123-year-old name Paine Webber disappeared when it was renamed "UBS Wealth Management USA".

== See also ==
- Kidder, Peabody & Co. (acquired)
- Blyth, Eastman Dillon & Co. (acquired)
