= Greek passport =

Travel document

Greek passport; Ελληνικό διαβατήριο
- The front cover of a contemporary Greek biometric passport

- The polycarbonate data page of a contemporary Greek biometric passport
- Type: Passport
- Issued by: Passport Centre of Greece
- First issued: 26 August 2006 (first biometric version) 18 December 2023 (new generation version) 1 January 2026 (listed type update)
- Purpose: Identification
- Eligibility: Greek citizenship
- Expiration: 3 years after issuance for individuals up to the age of 14; 10 years for adults (since 1st of September 2022)
- Cost: €80 (adults) / €71 (children)

Greek passports (Greek: Ελληνικό διαβατήριο, romanized: Ellīnikó diavatī́rio) are issued to Greek citizens for the purpose of international travel. Biometric passports have been issued since 26 August 2006, with old-style passports being declared invalid as of 1 January 2007. Since June 2009, the passport's RFID chip includes two index fingerprints as well as a high-resolution JPEG image of the passport holder. From 18 December 2023, issuance of the new generation of Greek passports was started by selected authorities and after 9 January 2024, only the new generation of passports are issued. Every Greek citizen is also a citizen of the European Union. The passport, along with the national identity card allows for free rights of movement and residence in any of the states of the European Union, European Economic Area, and Switzerland. Council of the European Union - PRADO - GRC-AO-04001 ?

== Passport appearance ==
The Greek passport follows the standard European Union passport design, with a burgundy red cover and the national emblem emblazoned on the centre of the front cover. The word ΔΙΑΒΑΤΗΡΙΟ (IPA: [ðʝavaˈtiri.o], Greek for "passport") is inscribed below the coat of arms, while ΕΥΡΩΠΑΪΚΗ ΕΝΩΣΗ (IPA: [evropaiˈci ˈenosi], "European Union") and ΕΛΛΗΝΙΚΗ ΔΗΜΟΚΡΑΤΙΑ (IPA: [eliniˈci ðimokraˈti.a], "Hellenic Republic") appear above. A Greek diplomatic passport has the same size and design as the standard one, but it features a black cover and the text ΔΙΠΛΩΜΑΤΙΚΟ ΔΙΑΒΑΤΗΡΙΟ (IPA: [ðiplomatiˈko ðʝavaˈtiri.o], "diplomatic passport") inscribed below the coat of arms. Greek passports contain 32 pages and are currently valid for up to 10 years. Previously, the passports were only valid for up to 5 years; this was changed on the 1 September 2022, when the new law was implemented.

All fields on the bearer's page are indicated in Greek and in English, with the translation in the other EU-languages elsewhere in the passport. The main information of the bearer (name and place of birth) are transcribed from the Greek to the Latin script, according to ELOT 743 scheme. The following fields are shown:

- Type (P for Passport)
- Passport number
- Country [ΕΛΛ/GRC]
- Surname [Greek/Latin script)
- Name [Greek/Latin script)
- Nationality [ΕΛΛΗΝΙΚΗ/Hellenic]
- Date of Birth [Latin script]
- Place of birth [Greek/Latin script]
- Sex [M/F]
- Issue Date [Latin script]
- Expiry Date [Latin script]
- Issuing Office [Greek/Latin script]
- Height

The bearer's page contains a machine readable strip starting with P<GRC.

Since 1/1/2026, according to new ICAO guidelines, all Greek passports now have PP listed as the type for ordinary passports. This change also affects the MRZ, which now starts with PP<GRC

== Security features ==
The Greek passport, including the previous biometric version, meets international standards as defined by the International Civil Aviation Organization (ICAO). Document: GRC-AO-04001 - PRADO - Public Register of Authentic identity and travel Documents Online The personal data page of the new generation passport is made of high strength polycarbonate material and has cutting-edge security features such as transparent diffractive optically variable image device (DOVID) and multi laser image (MLI). Laser engraving is used to print the personal data, including the color photo; rendering any forgery attempts impossible.

Some of the features of the previous version include holographic lamination (O.V.D.), color-shifting ink (O.V.I.), see-through register, pages with intricate designs with microtext, watermarks, security threads, images visible only with ultraviolet light, raised (intaglio) printing, and a chip. The data stored on the chip are protected by using advanced digital encryption techniques.

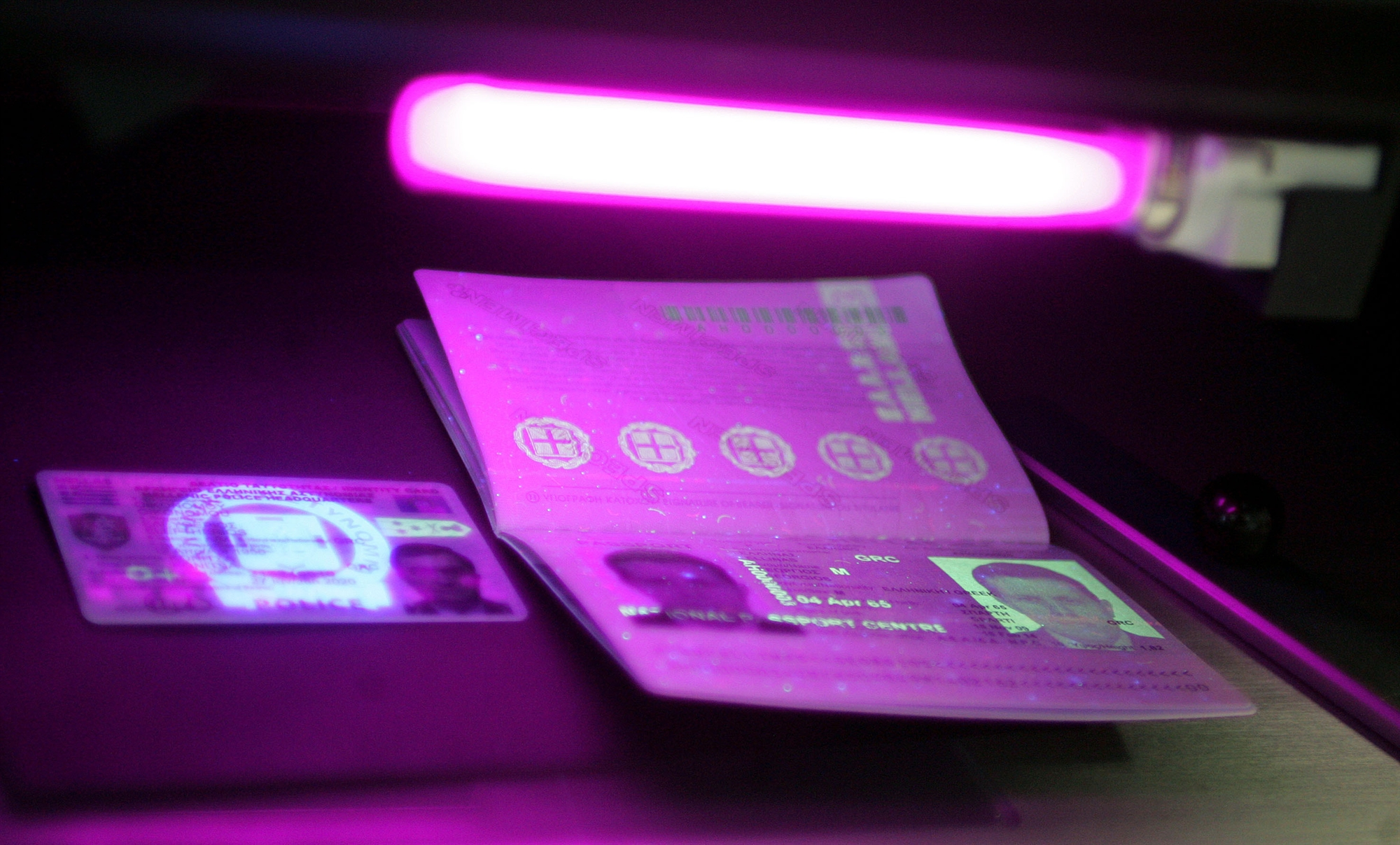
Under the UV light, the hidden portrait appears (AH series)

== Greek citizenship ==
According to the Passport Index, in 2023 the Greek passport is on the fourth place in the world ranking, sharing this position with Canadian, Japanese and Australian passports. It gives its owners visa-free entry to 126 countries.

Greece only offers passports to its current citizens. Applicants must prove their Greek origin.

== Issuing process ==
Greek passports are issued by the National Passport Centre ("Διεύθυνση Διαβατηρίων/Αρχηγείο Ελληνικής Αστυνομίας"). Applicants have to apply in person at the local police department or at a Greek Consulate Authority. All children must be accompanied by both parents, or the parent who has the legal custody in cases of divorce. Upon submitting all the required documents (passport photo, fingerprints for adults and children over the age of 12, issuing request, and fee), the police department begins the issuing procedure. All passports are manufactured centrally at the N.P.C main building in Athens. Depending on the circumstances, passports are issued in 3 to 9 business days and must be picked up at the police department or consulate authority in which the issuing request was made. For this, an applicant must carry with them a special receipt they received after applying and their old passport (if it exists). Standard passports are valid for a period of 10 years for people 14 years old and older, and 3 years for children under 14 (after the official edition of the 135th Presidential decree in 2007).

Greek passports cannot be extended. A holder has the right to apply for a new passport up to a year before their current passport expires.

The issuing of a standard adult passport costs €84.40, while that of a child costs €73.60. Reissuance of an existing and still-valid passport with no blank pages is possible with a validity date equal to the previous passport and a cost of €53. Since December 2024 the fees decreased to 80 euros per adult passport instead of 84.40 euros "Receipt of deposited Administrative fees. For a 10 year expiration date passport, total value of 80,00 euro Administrative fee is required, which is apportioned to: Stamp deposit fee: 22,00 euro, Passport booklet fee: 53,00 euro and Postal fee: 5,00 euro. For passports issued in accordance to Article 1 §3 P.D. 25/2022 and Article 4 §3 P.D. 25/2022, 13 month expiration date passport, total value of 67,00 euro Administrative fee is required, which is apportioned to: Stamp deposit fee: 9,00 euro, Passport booklet fee: 53,00 euro and Postal fee: 5,00 euro. For cases where fingerprinting is currently unavailable, 8 month expiration date passport, total value of 62,50 euro Administrative fee is required, which is apportioned to: Stamp deposit fee: 4,50 euro, Passport booklet fee: 53,00 euro and Postal fee: 5,00 euro. For passports issued in accordance to article 1 §4 case b P.D. 25/2022, 3 month expiration date passport, total value of 62,50 euro Administrative fee is required, which is apportioned to: Stamp deposit fee: 4,50 euro, Passport booklet fee: 53,00 euro and Postal fee: 5,00 euro." Questions about the supporting documents, fees etc - Frequently Asked Questions

== Visa free travel ==
Visa requirements for Greek citizens Greece Freedom of movement and work Visa free Visa issued upon arrival eVisa Visa available both on arrival or online Visa required prior to arrival

Visa requirements for Greek citizens are administrative entry restrictions by the authorities of other states placed on citizens of Greece. As of 19 June 2023, Greek citizens had visa-free or visa-on-arrival access to 188 countries and territories, ranking the Greek passport 6th in the world according to the Visa Restrictions Index. Additionally, Arton Capital's Passport Index ranked the Greek passport 4th in the world in terms of travel freedom, with a visa-free score of 172 (tied with Czech, Lithuanian, Canadian, Hungarian, Japanese and US and Australian passports), as of 19 June 2023.

== Gallery of passports ==
in 1932
Second Hellenic Republic

in 1970
Kingdom of Greece

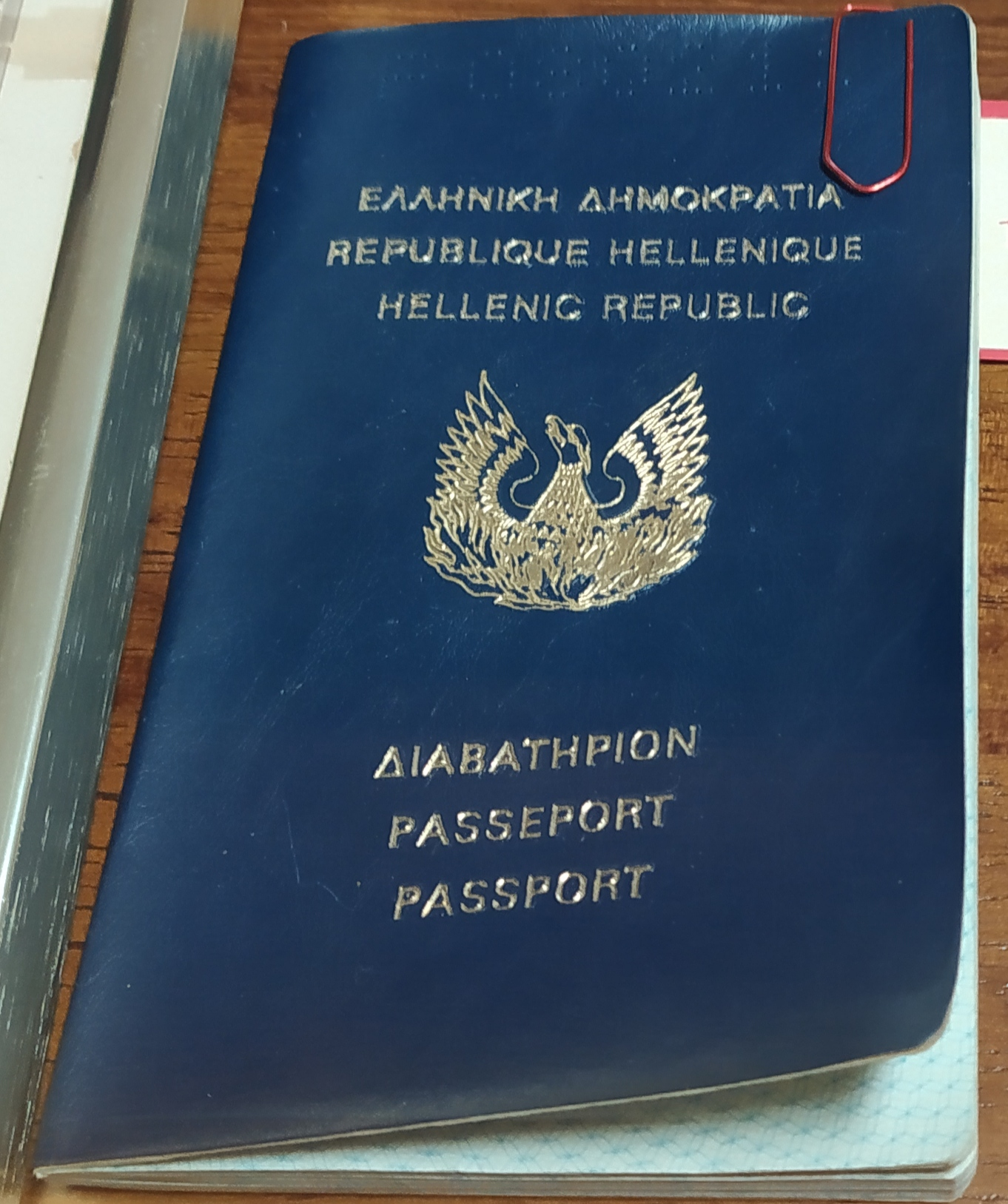
in 1973 (first phoenix version)
Junta-led Republic

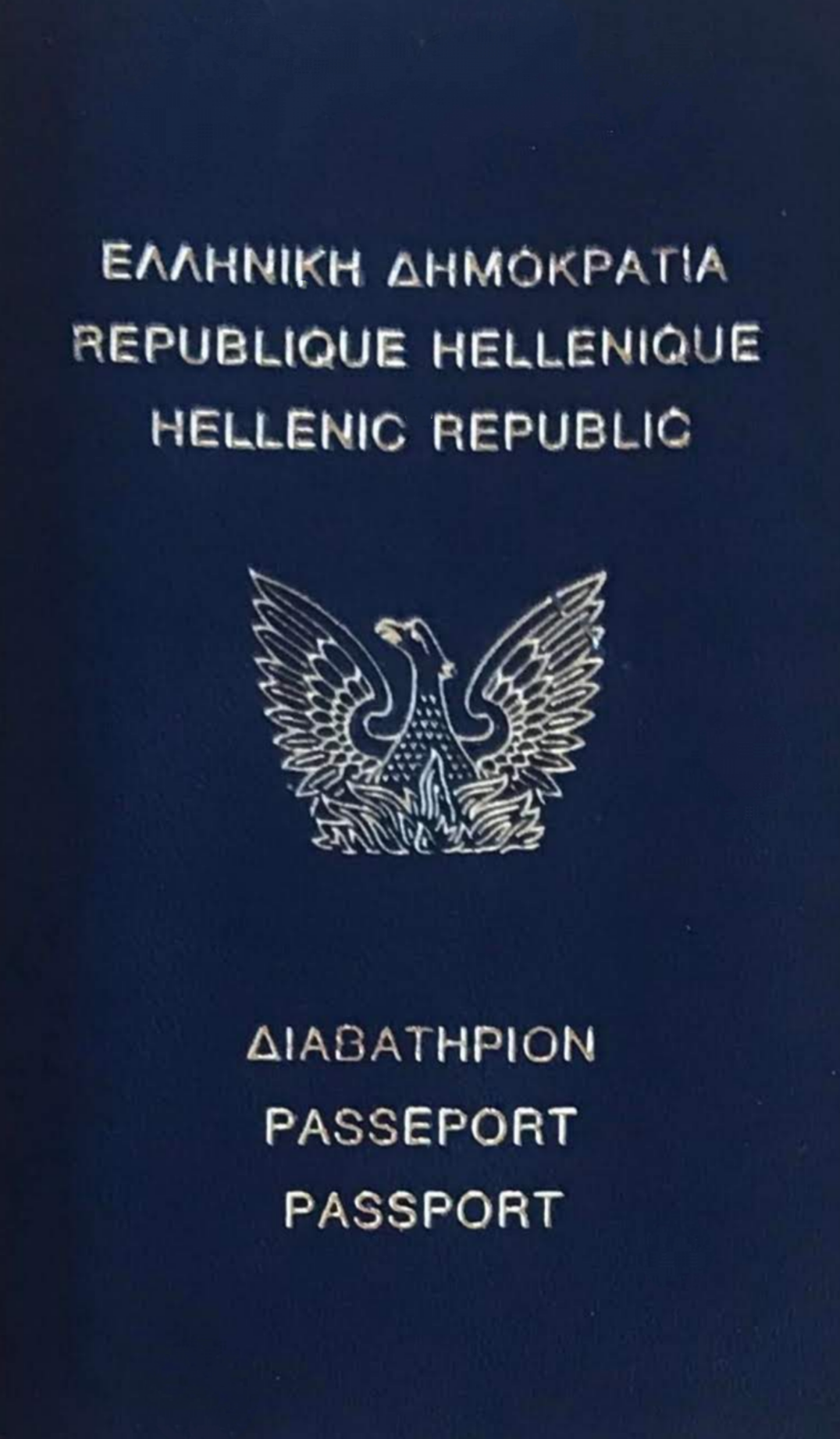
in 1973 (second phoenix version)
Junta-led Republic

in 1980
Third Hellenic Republic

in 2006
Third Hellenic Republic

2007–present
Third Hellenic Republic

2007–present
diplomatic version

== See also ==
- Greek identity card
- Driving licence in Greece
- Visa requirements for Greek citizens
- Visa policy of the Schengen Area
- Greek nationality law
- Passports of the European Union
