= Greek identity card =

National identity card of Greece

Greek Identity Card (Δελτίο Ταυτότητας)
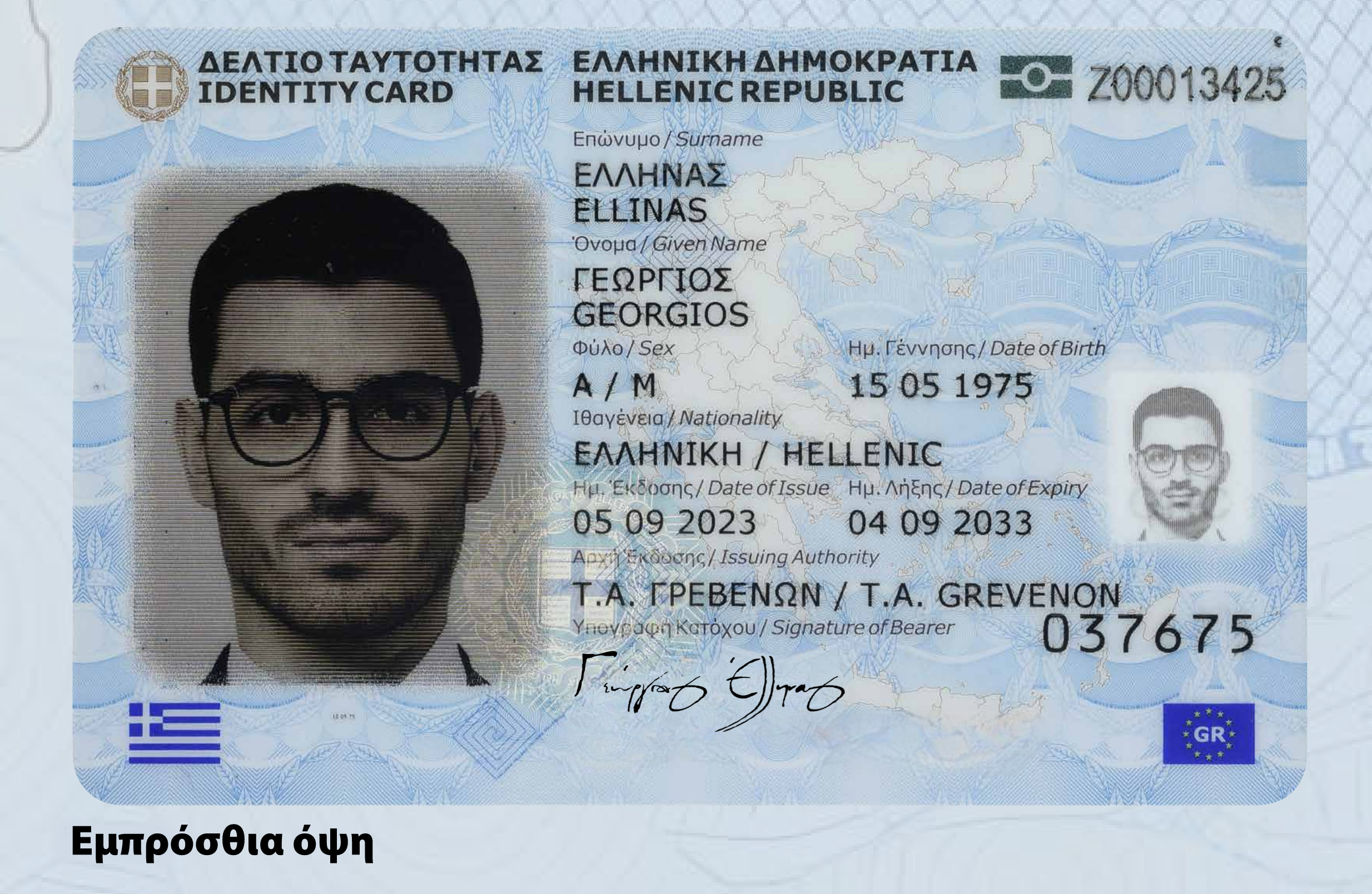
- Greek national ID card front side

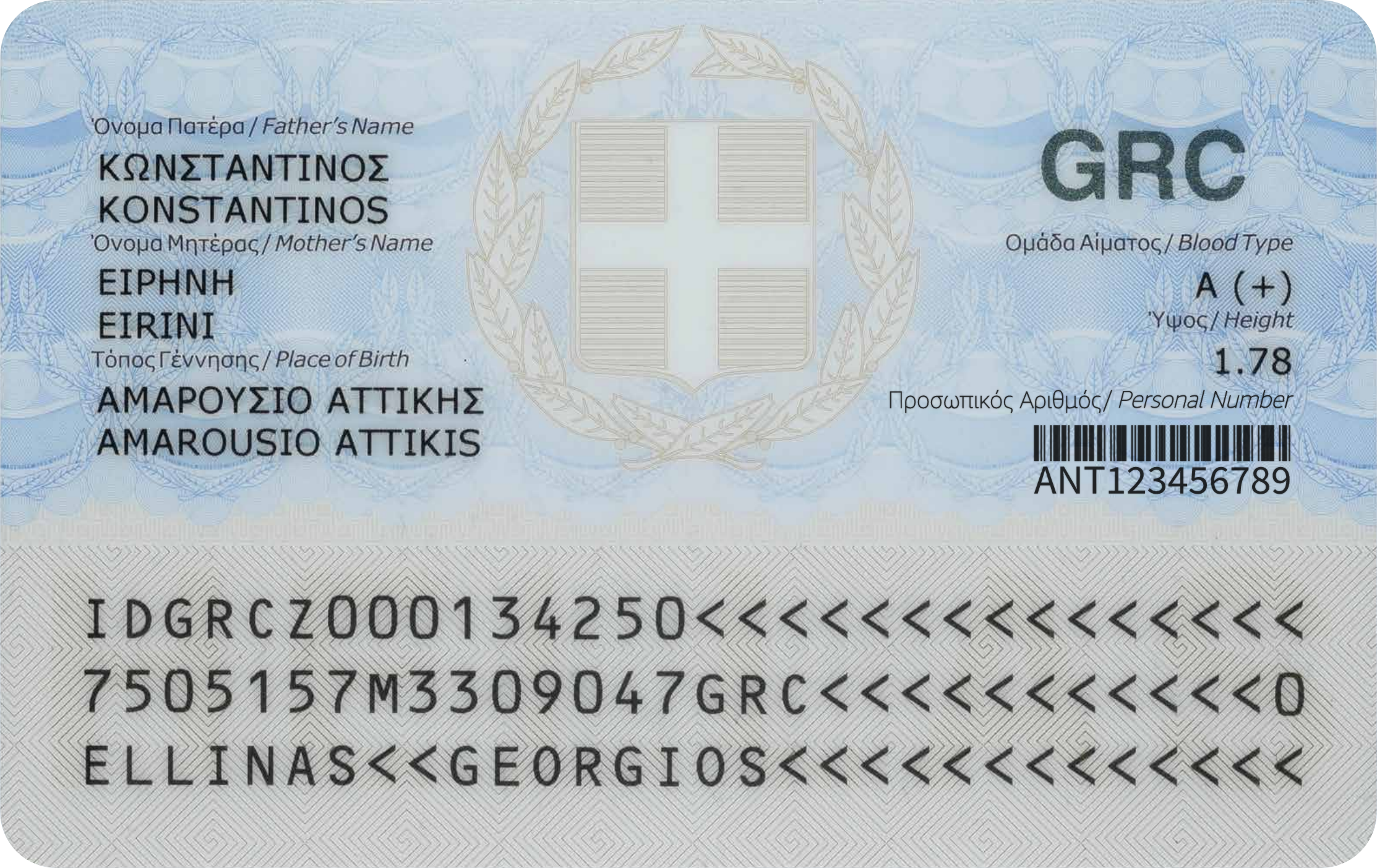
- Greek national ID card back side
- Type: Compulsory identity document, travel document in listed countries
- Issued by: Greece via Hellenic Police
- First issued: 1925 (first version); 1959 (second version); 1986 (blue plasticized card version); 25 September 2023 (current form)
- Valid in: EFTA; European Union; United Kingdom (EU Settlement Scheme); Rest of Europe (except Belarus, Russia, and Ukraine) Georgia; Montserrat (max. 14 days); Overseas France; Turkey
- Eligibility: Greek citizenship
- Expiration: 10 years
- Cost: 10,50€ (general cost); 5,50€ (for multi-child families); 19 € (if your current document gets lost/stolen, 14€ for multi-child families)
- Size: ID-1

The Greek identity card (Greek: Δελτίο ταυτότητας, "identification card") is the official national identification document for Greek citizens. It is issued by the Hellenic Police.

Possession of the card is mandatory for all Greek citizens 12 years of age and older. Citizens are always required to carry an identification document (namely an identity card, a passport, or a driving licence) and produce it upon request – failing to do so may result in the citizen's identification at the nearest police station.

The card is a valid international travel document in Europe (except to Belarus, Russia, Ukraine and for non-settled Greeks to the United Kingdom), to French overseas territories, Georgia, Turkey, Tunisia (on organized tours) and Montserrat (for 14 days in transit to a third country). It is also used to identify a person as a citizen for local and EU elections.

Military staff, as well as members of the police, fire service, coastguard, and intelligence services, carry special IDs issued by their sector, which are valid until retirement or conclusion of their services. These documents are issued instead of the standard police-issued identity card, but ID cards of police personnel can also be used as travel documents.

== New-format ID cards ==
Since 2010, Police Staff, Special Guards and Border Guards have high-security identity cards, that meet international standards. There had been unofficial talks of switching to a new ID type, one that could possibly bear the holder's social security number, a biometric photograph and other security features, sized down to that of a credit card. After the November 2015 Paris attacks, the Greek Ministry of Interior started considering switching to the new ID type. On March 11, 2016, the Greek Ministry of Interior established a commission to create a plan for the new ID cards. Technical plans and draft legislation were prepared by June 2016. Based on reports the legislation will be enacted in 2017 followed by an open tendering process. Issuance of the new ID card will start in 2019. In 2021, the government ran a competition to choose who will issue the new IDs.

On 23 July 2017 the alternate Minister of Interior stated in an interview that an amendment has been filed with the Greek Parliament in order to amend the format with a ministerial decision. Pursuant to Article 158, Law 4483/2017 the Minister of Interior was given the authority to add data of the holder that were not defined in law and to set any necessary detail regarding ID cards. On April 30, 2018, the ministerial decision was published in the Government Gazette, which defines the procedures for the issuance and design of the new identity cards. The release was expected to begin in the first half of 2018 but was delayed due to technical specifications being challenged at the time. Moreover, a tender process started on 18 April 2019 to select the contractor that would be responsible for the issuance of the new Greek ID cards along with other secure documents, as part of the Integrated Information System for Security Documents (IISSD).

On February 17, 2023, some further changes were made to the issuance process and the characteristics of the existing ID cards, such as the reduction of their validity from 15 to 10 years and the removal of the AMKA field, as it is planned to be replaced with a Personal Number for each Greek citizen. The provision for mandatory replacement of unexpired old-format ID cards within five years was also eliminated, given that Regulation 2019/1157 of the European Parliament and the Council of 20 June 2019 expressly states in article 5 paragraph 2 subsection a thereof that identity cards that do not meet the minimum security standards of ICAO Doc 9303 or that do not have a machine-readable zone (both apply for the old-format Greek identity cards) expire on August 3, 2026. Last but not least, it is now stipulated that, when applying for a new e-identity card, the citizen must present a photo in digital format through myphoto.gov.gr.

Issuance of new Greek ID cards started on September 25, 2023.

=== Technical characteristics and security features ===
New ID cards measure 85.6mm ± 0.75mm by 54.0mm ± 0.75mm and are made of polycarbonate material. They follow the ID1 format and are similar to a credit card, in compliance with ICAO international standards and the country's legal requirements under EU Regulation no. 2019/1157.

The printing method used is laser engraving, which applies all details, as well as the colour photo, on the inner layer of the ID card, rendering any forgery attempts impossible.

New Greek ID cards incorporate modern security features to enhance security and prevent counterfeiting, such as transparent diffractive optically variable image device (DOVID), colour shifting ink (OVI), changing laser image (CLI), tactile relief, microtext and invisible UV rainbow print. They also include a Machine Readable Zone (MRZ) and they utilize a contactless electronic storage medium in the form of an RFID chip.

== Old-format ID cards (1986-2023) ==
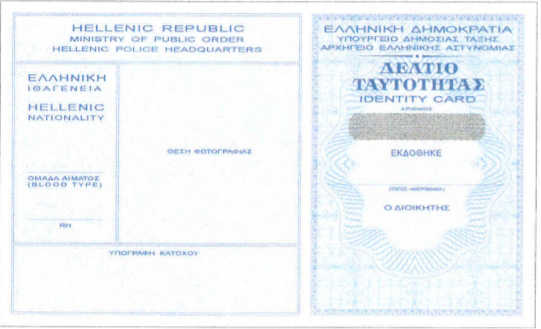
Citizen

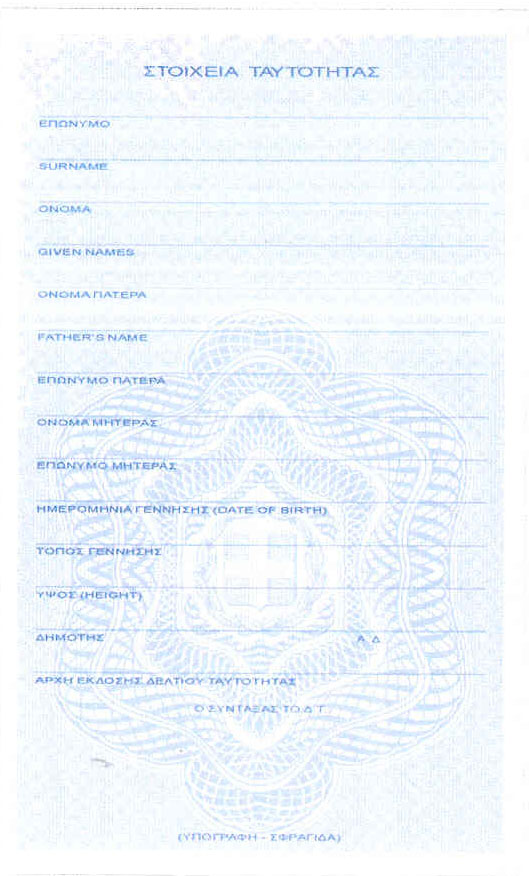
Front and back side of the old-format ID card.

The front side includes areas bearing the holder's signature, a black and white photograph of specific standards, the blood type (optional) and rhesus factor, as well as data of the identity card (number, place and date of issue, issuing authority). The back side includes the surname, first name and the name of the legal ascendant(s) of the identity card holder with Greek and Latin characters, as well as date and place of birth, height, the municipality in which the holder is registered and the authority issuing the identity card.

Before 2005, the ID card was mandatory for citizens over 14 years of age and included data that has been removed after 2005 due to privacy concerns or because they are no longer considered necessary for the purpose of identification. This data is: profession, religion, address, name of spouse, head shape, right hand index fingerprint, eye and hair colour, citizenship. New ID cards indicate the holder's Greek citizenship once again, while also reintroducing fingerprint data, albeit only stored in the machine readable zone and not visible on the card itself.

According to EU Regulation no. 2019/1157, old-format ID cards are valid until August 3, 2026, if they have not already expired by then.

=== Technical characteristics ===
Old-format Greek identity cards are made of laminated paper, measuring 11 by 6.5 centimetres (4.3 by 2.6 in). As a means of preventing counterfeiting, the paper bears a watermark, security thread and fluorescent overprint elements, but otherwise lacks security features (i.e. micro-chips, holograms) found in new-format IDs.

== Controversies ==
=== Religious affiliation removal ===
On May 8, 2000, in an interview published in newspaper Eleftherotypia, Minister of Justice Michael Stathopoulos announced that the mandatory inclusion of religious affiliation on identity cards was contrary to law 2472/1997 for the protection of personal data. The Church of Greece immediately objected to the removal and organizing rallies, among which a rally in Thessaloniki on 14 June, in the presence of then Archbishop Christodoulos. The Public Order Minister announced on 17 July that religious affiliation would be removed from the new identities. On September 24, 2000, the orthodox church began collecting signatures in the parishes, seeking a referendum. The petition was completed in April 2001, gathering more than 3 million signatures. On August 29, 2001, Archbishop delivered the signatures to the President of the Hellenic Republic Konstantinos Stephanopoulos, who refused to order for a referendum saying that "everyone must comply to State Law".

The Council of State decided that the mandatory inclusion of religious affiliation on identity cards is not legal, while the Hellenic Data Protection Authority also opposed to the optional reference to religion by adding the letters "XO" (Christian Orthodox - Χριστιανός Ορθόδοξος) following the signature of the bearer. The legality of collecting signatures was also questioned by the Minister of Justice Michael Stathopoulos.

=== Conspiracy theories ===
The issuance of the new ID cards in September 2023 has led to conspiracy theories on social media, with claims that the cards will include tracking chips. Despite government assurances that the IDs won't have geolocation systems, conspiracy theorists are concerned about the electronic chip on the cards. Opponents of the new IDs have organized protests, arguing against government control through technology.

== See also ==
- National identity cards in the European Economic Area

== Sources ==
- The first version of this article was based on el:Δελτίο αστυνομικής ταυτότητας (Ελλάδα), contributed under CC-BY-SA.
- Greek Police - Identity Card Version (In Greek)
- Greek ID PRADO Documentation

Αριθμ. 8200/0-109568 – ΦΕΚ Τεύχος Β 824/17.02.2023 new law introduce expiration of Hellenic/ Greek ID Card reduced from 15 years to 10 years νέας Κοινής Υπουργικής Απόφασης (8200/0-109568/2023).
