= Kinegram =

Kinegram may refer to:

- A type of diffractive optically variable image device used to prevent counterfeiting
- A type of barrier-grid animation
