= Driving licence in Greece =

Greek Driving Licence
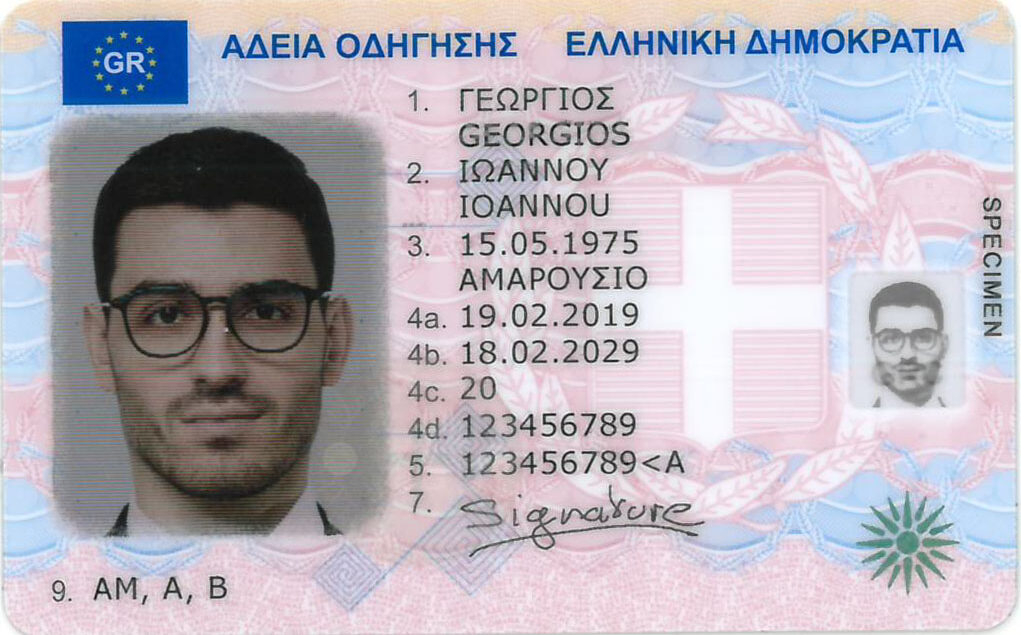

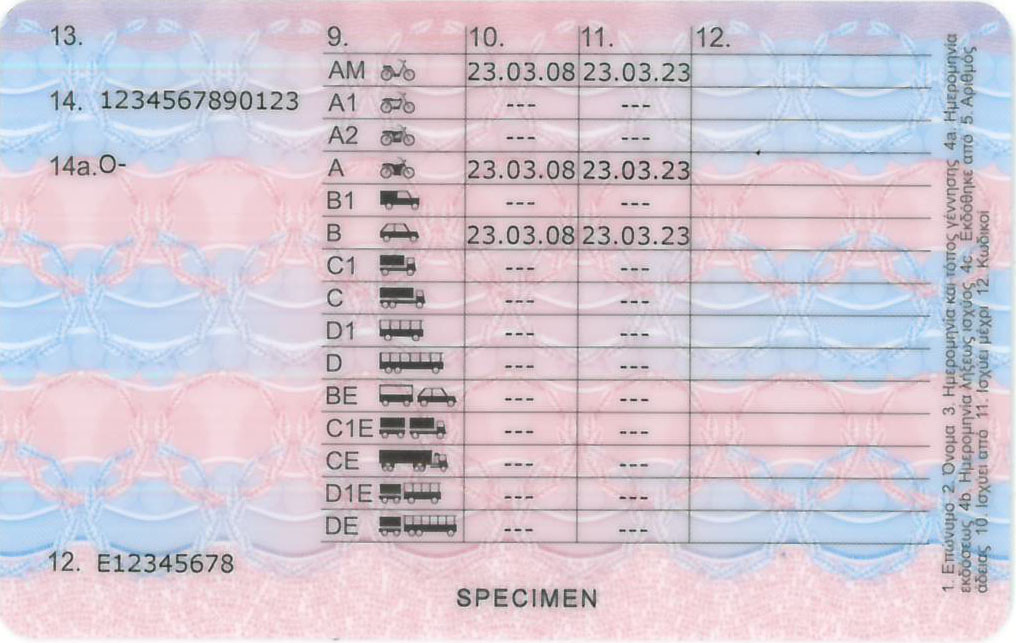
- The front and back of a Greek Driving Licence issued 2023-present in the format of the standardized European driving licence style
- Type: Driving licence
- Issued by: Ministry of Infrastructure and Transport (Greece)
- Purpose: Proof of permission to legally operate a motor vehicle, Identification
- Valid in: Greece, European Union, Countries with licence mutual recognition agreements.
- Eligibility: Driver candidates who pass theoretical and practical testing

In Greece, the driving licence ("ΑΔΕΙΑ ΟΔΗΓΗΣΗΣ") is a governmental document given to those who request permission to drive a category of motor vehicle/s and meet set requirements.

Driving licences are required for every type of motorised vehicle. The minimum age to obtain a driving licence is 16 years for mopeds and low power motorcycles maximum of 50cc, 18 years for cars (max gross weight of 3.500 kg and up to 8 passengers exc. driver) (B) and up to 125cc (A1), 20 years for more powerful motorcycles or scooters up to 35 kW or 400cc (A2), and 18 to 21 years of age for buses and cargo vehicles (depending on passenger limitand weight respectively). Unlimited power capacity motorcycles (A), can be acquired at 24 years olds or 22 years if the person had an A2 licence for 2 years.

== Obtaining a driving licence ==
This driving licence can be obtained after finishing a driving school and passing a two-stage test, the theory test and road test. A primary school diploma was also required to obtain a driving licence, but is no longer requested in the application process.

Most foreign drivers of non-EU countries are required to have an International Driving Permit. There are however countries that have driving licence mutual recognition agreements with Greece or the EU as a whole.

The current list of mutual recognition countries include: Switzerland, Republic of Serbia, Republic of Albania, the United States of America, Canada, Australia, Japan, South Africa, South Korea and the countries of the former Soviet Union for expatriates. Holders of these licences may be entitled to temporarily drive in Greece with their home country's licence without an IDP, or to convert their licence to a Greek one without undertaking any additional examinations. As these agreements are subject to change over time, visitors are advised to consult with their home country's authorities or the nearest Greek police station, consulate or embassy for information regarding driving in Greece with their licence and mutual recognition.

== Data field labelling ==
As a member of the EU, Greece follows the standardised data formatting for its contemporary licences. The data fields are described in Greek on the back, and are as follows:

- 1. Surname
- 2. First Name
- 3. Date and place of birth
- 4. a) date of issue, b) date of expiry, c) issuing authority, d) Tax File Number (ΑΦΜ).
- 5. Licence number
- 6. Photograph of holder (not numbered)
- 7. Signature of holder
- 9. Licence categories
- 10. First issuing date of the category (in the rear table, listed per category)
- 11. Expiry date of the category (in the rear table, listed per category)
- 12. Restrictions (number coded, in the rear table, listed per category, and once for information applying to all categories, includes restrictions like automatic transmission)
- 13. Remarks
- 14. Licence reference number (not licence number)
- 14a. Blood Type (ABO Rh-) (optional)

The fields for "restrictions" (number 12) contain numeric codes which are used to convey additional information that goes beyond the licence categories. Codes 01-99 are valid EU-wide, while codes 100 and above are national codes valid only in Greece.

=== EU-wide restriction codes (data field 12) ===
Code	Title	Description
01	Sight Correction/Protection	Required use of vision aids while driving. (e.g. 01.02 means Driving with Contact Lenses)
02	Hearing Aid/Communication Aid	Required use of hearing or communication aids while driving.
03	Prosthesis/Orthosis for Limbs	Required use of prosthetic or orthotic devices.
05	Restricted Use (Medical Reasons)	Use is restricted based on medical conditions (compulsory use of subcode). (e.g. 05.01 means driving limited to daytime, 05.08 means prohibition of any alcohol)
10	Modified Transmission	Vehicle must have modifications to the transmission system.
15	Modified Clutch	Vehicle must have a modified clutch system.
20	Modified Braking Systems	Vehicle must have modifications to the braking system.
25	Modified Accelerator System	Vehicle must have modifications to the accelerator system.
30	Combined Braking & Accelerator	Vehicle must have modified combined braking and accelerator systems.
35	Modified Control Layouts	Vehicle must have modified control layouts (e.g., for operating lights, wipers, horn).
40	Modified Steering	Vehicle must have modifications to the steering system.
42	Modified View Devices	Vehicle must have modified rear/side view devices (e.g., extra mirrors).
43	Modified Seating Position	Vehicle must have a modified driving seating position.
44	Motorcycle Modifications	Vehicle must be a motorcycle with specific adaptations (compulsory use of subcode).
50	Specific Vehicle (VIN)	Restricted to driving a specific vehicle based on its VIN (Vehicle Identification Number).
70	Exchange of Non-EU Licence	Exchange of a licence issued by a non-EU/EEA country (country code in brackets).
71	Duplicate Licence	Duplicate of licence number.
78	Automatic Transmission Only	Restricted to driving vehicles with automatic transmission.
79	Limited to Specific Vehicles	Restricted to vehicles complying with the specifications indicated in brackets (e.g., 79.03 for Tricycles).
95	Professional Competence (CPC)	Driver holding a CPC and satisfying the periodic training obligation (for professional drivers).
96	Category B Combination (B96)	Category B vehicles coupled with a trailer where the combination's total authorised mass is >3,500 kg but ≤4,250 kg.

== Durations of validity ==
The duration of the validity for Greek driving licences depends on the age of the bearer, as well as the categories listed on the licence. The validity durations for category B and other non-professional categories are:

- 15 years up to age 65
- 3 years from age 65 up to age 80
- 2 years above age 80

For professional categories such as C1, C1E, C, CE, D1, D1E, D and DE a medical examination is required with every renewal. The validity periods for professional categories are:

- 5 years up to age 65
- 3 years from age 65 up to age 80
- 2 years above age 80

== Temporary driving licence ==
Temporary Driving Licence
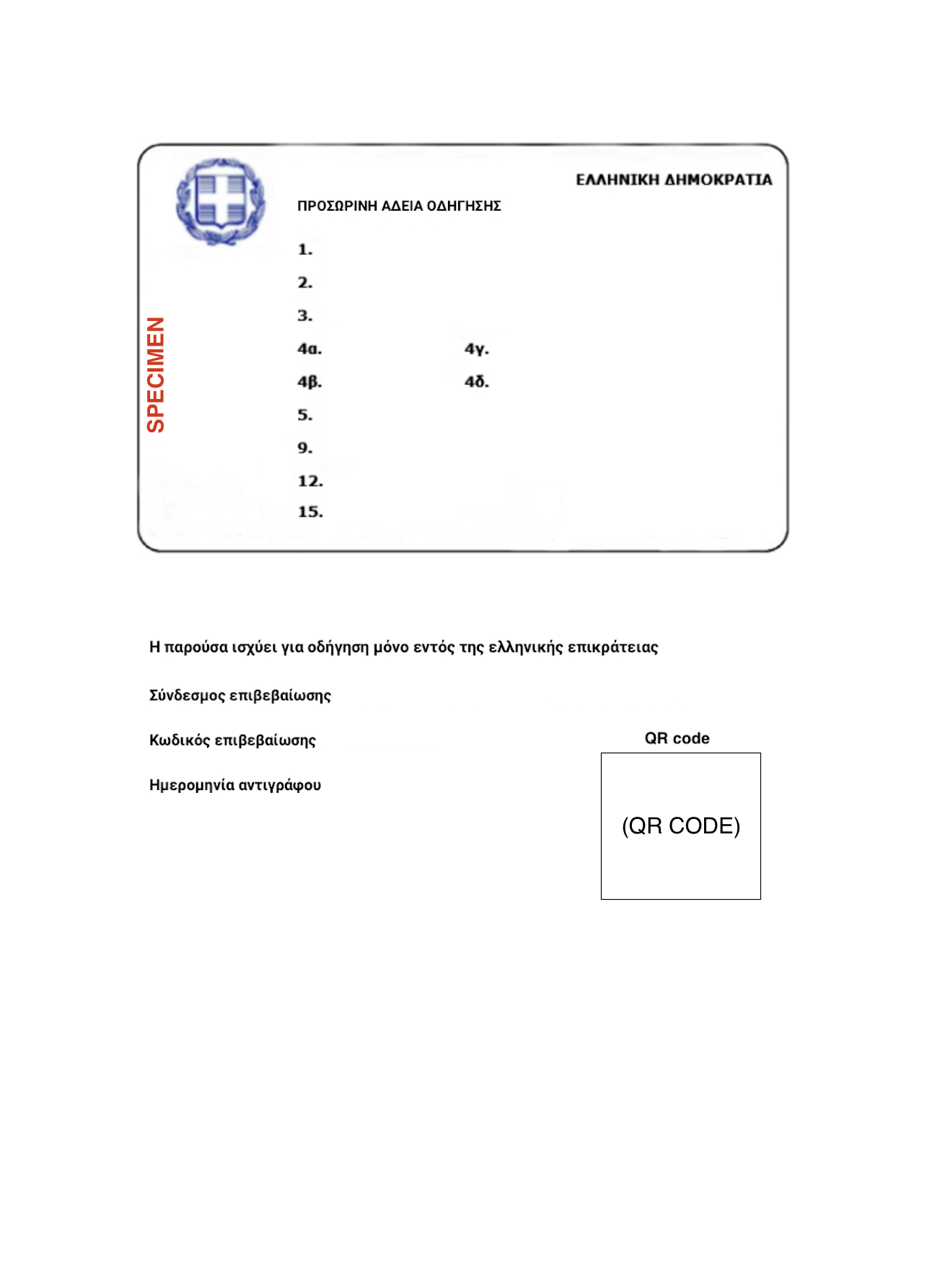
- Expiration: 6 months after issuance (maximum)

Successful road tests from 2020 onwards grant access to a temporary driving permit (usable for up to six months), allowing its new holders to drive legally at nationwide level until their physical licence is delivered to them.

The document can be presented in digital or printed format, and features a unique QR code. Upon scanning the QR code, the information and validity of the temporary driver licence can be verified on the Greek Government's official website, making the document easily verifiable by the authorities.

On the bottom of the temporary licence, it is stated that "This document is valid for driving only within Greece". The temporary driving licence is not accepted by Automobile and Touring Club of Greece for issuing an International Driving Permit, if the holder wishes to obtain one, they will have to wait until their licence arrives in card format. This is due to the inscription limiting its use within Greece, as well as the lack of a photo and signature of the licence holder.

== Digital driving licence ==
Like many EU countries, Greece has launched a "digital wallet" app using the national information network TaxisNet. Using their credentials, holders of Greek driving licences as well as the Greek identity card can access their documents in digital format. The digital versions are currently only valid within Greece. Use of physical identity documents is still much more common than their digital counterparts.

== Security features ==
In 2023, Greece upgraded the security features on its driving licence since 2013. This was done in compliance with EU legislation. The new version has many security features also found on the Greek identity card, making them almost impossible to counterfeit. Due to the complexity of production and high levels of demand for driving licences, applicants have to wait from a few weeks up to 6 months in order to receive their licence in card format. Until then, the temporary driving licence document is used.

== Historical licence designs ==
A collection of all the driving licences issued in Greece from 1901-present.

Period Issued	Front	Back
2023-Present		
2013-2023		
2009-2013		
2001-2009		
1997-2001		
1987-1997		
1985-2013 (mopeds only)		
1901-1987 (category A)		
1901-1987 (category B, non-professional)		

== See also ==
- European driving licence
- Vehicle registration plates of Greece
- Greek identity card
- Greek passport
