= Kinebar =

Gold bar which contains a Kinegram

A kinebar is a gold bar that has a diffractive optically variable image device (similar to a security hologram) embossed into the surface of the gold. The device used is a "Kinegram" made by OVD Kinegram AG (Switzerland).

== Bar ==
The Kinegram technology is exclusively provided to governments, and is intended both as a high-security feature and for visual appeal.

Union Bank of Switzerland, through Argor-Heraeus SA (subsidiary of Commerzbank), has been applying the kinegram as a security device to the reverse of its minted bars since December 1993. The kinebar, now produced by UBS AG, is a registered trade mark of UBS.

Argor-Heraeus gold Kinebars were introduced in 1994 in the following weights - 1 g, 2 g, 5 g, 10 g, 20 g, and 1 oz. The 50 g and 100 g gold Kinebars were subsequently released in 2012.

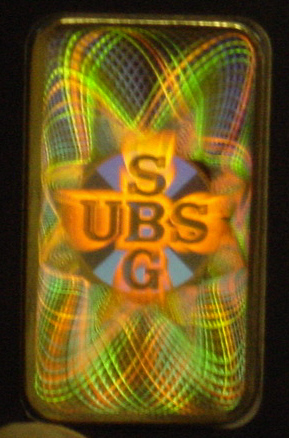
Kinebar one troy ounce

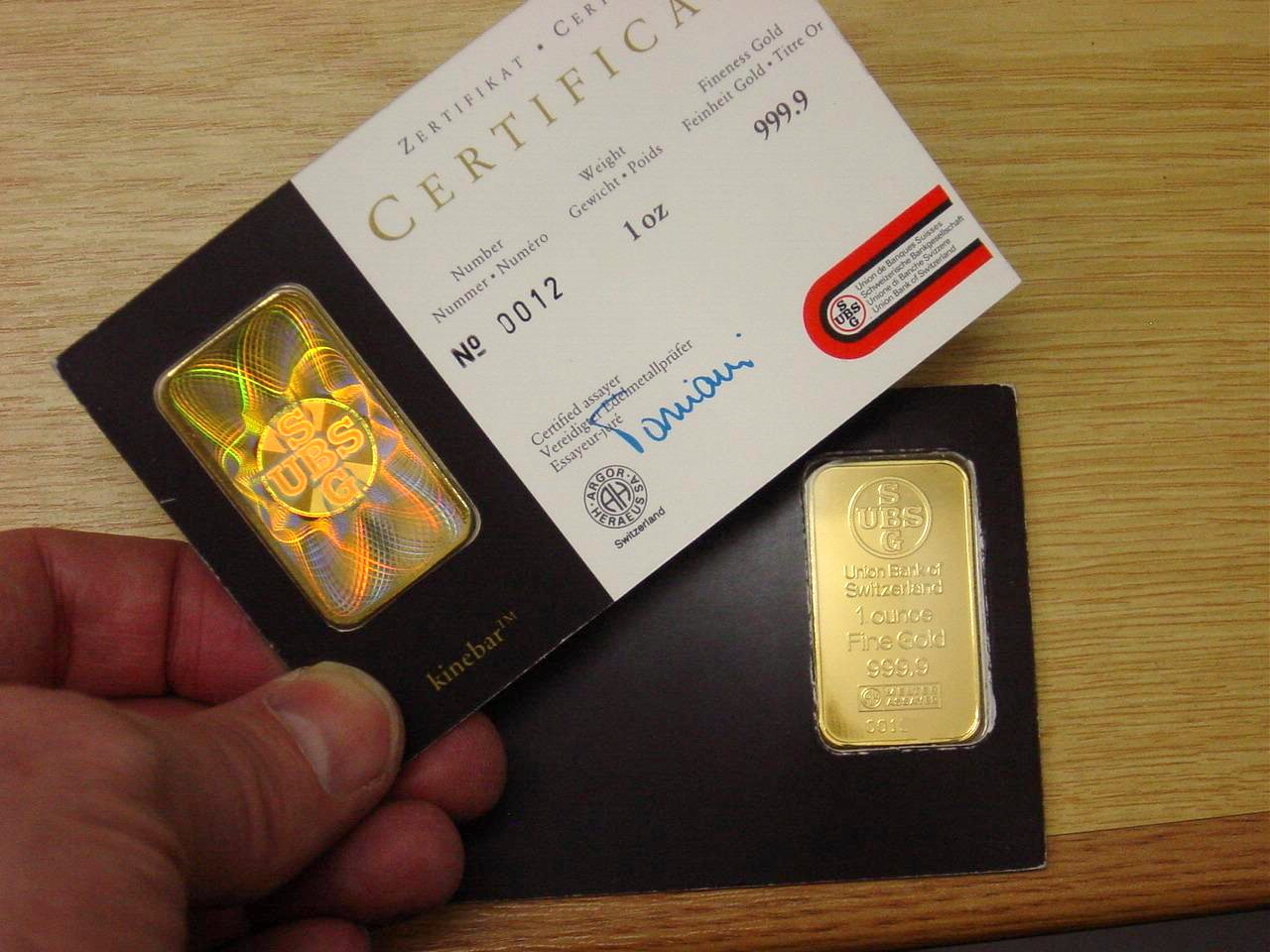
Kinebar certificate

Kinegram

== See also ==
- Gold as an investment
