= Greek nationality law =

Greek Citizenship Act.

Parliament of Greece
- Long title: An Act relating to Greek citizenship
- Enacted by: Government of Greece
- Status: Current legislation

Nationality law of Greece is based on the principle of jus sanguinis. Greek citizenship may be acquired by descent or through naturalization. Greek law permits dual citizenship. A Greek national is a citizen of the European Union, and therefore entitled to the same rights as other EU citizens.

== Descent ==
A child of a Greek citizen acquires Greek nationality automatically at birth. The same applies to children born in Greece whose parents have lived legally and permanently in Greece for five years. Children born abroad and whose parents have lived legally and permanently in Greece for five years become Greek citizens upon successful completion of elementary education (six years). Greeks born abroad may transmit citizenship to their children from generation to generation indefinitely.

A child born out of wedlock is automatically Greek if the mother is Greek (see matrilineality). If the father is Greek and paternity can be proven (for example, through a paternity test), the child will become Greek when an application is submitted for the child to become a Greek citizen, providing the child has not yet reached the age of 18. An alien who is over 18 may become Greek by naturalization.

A child over 18 of a Greek father does not need to go through naturalization if they can demonstrate a lineage of Greek citizenship through appropriately documented birth and marriage certificates.

An ethnic Greek born outside of Greece may acquire Greek citizenship by naturalization if they fail to qualify for simple registration as the child of a Greek citizen. (This provision excludes Greek Cypriots, who may seek Cypriot citizenship instead.) The applicant must prove that at least one parent or grandparent was born a Greek national.

== Naturalization ==
Naturalization requirements are different for ethnic Greek and non-ethnic Greek aliens:

- The alien ethnic Greek must make a declaration—in the presence of two witnesses, who must be Greek citizens—before the mayor or chairman of the village council where they live, which states they wish to be naturalized.
- The alien may submit this declaration to the Greek consul of their domicile, who transmits it to the Ministry of the Interior with a relevant report.
- An alien who is not an ethnic Greek must live in Greece for seven years before the declaration. They must also submit an application for naturalization to the Ministry of the Interior.

Children born in Greece with parents who are legal permanent residents or children who finish 6 years of primary or secondary education can request to become Greek citizens.

Children of a naturalized alien become Greeks if, at the time of completion of the naturalization proceedings, they are not married and are less than 18 years old.

== Marriage ==
At present, marriage does not entail the acquisition or loss of Greek nationality. Before 1984, a woman marrying a Greek national became Greek automatically.

== Naturalization by military service or monasticism in Mount Athos ==
Ethnic Greeks accepted to the military academies for officers or non-commissioned officers of the Greek armed forces (according to the special law governing each school) or who enlist in the armed forces as volunteers (according to the law governing each branch) acquire Greek nationality automatically from the time they enter the academies or are enlisted. Moreover, according to the Greek constitution, aliens admitted as monks in one of the monasteries of Mount Athos become Greek automatically.

== Loss of citizenship ==
A Greek national does not usually lose their Greek citizenship when they obtain another nationality unless they specifically request it or in the rare case where a permit for citizenship was granted for by the Greek government to that citizen and they subsequently obtain the citizenship of another country. A Greek citizen may voluntarily renounce citizenship by submitting an application to the Ministry of Interior in Athens. For male Greek nationals, renunciation of citizenship is subject to the completion of their military duties.

Article 19 of the Greek Citizenship Code (Law 3370 of 1955) stated: "A person of non-Greek ethnic origin leaving Greece without the intention of returning may be declared as having lost Greek citizenship. This also applies to a person of non-Greek ethnic origin born and domiciled abroad. Minor children living abroad may be declared as having lost Greek citizenship if both their parents, or the surviving parent, have lost it as well." (The Minister of the Interior decides such cases, with the concurring opinion of the Citizenship Council.).

Article 19 was abolished in 1998, but no provision was established for restoring citizenship to people who had lost it. Interior Minister Alekos Papadopoulos stated that, since the article's introduction in 1955, 60,000 Greeks had lost their citizenship because of it, many of these people moved and adopted the nationality of another country. However, an estimated 300–1,000 people remain stateless in Greece (primarily minorities in Thrace, some of whom never settled abroad) and other former Greek citizens are stateless outside the country (an estimated 1,400 in Turkey and an unknown number elsewhere).

Stateless individuals in Greece have had difficulty receiving social services like health care and education. Until December 1997, they were denied the protection of the 1954 U.N. Convention Relating to the Status of Stateless Persons, which Greece ratified in 1975. Then, as a result of pressure from nongovernmental organizations and minority deputies, around 100 ethnic Turks made stateless under Article 19 received identity documents from Greek authorities in accordance with the 1954 U.N. Convention. In August 1998, Foreign Minister Theodoros Pangalos stated that within a year, most or all stateless persons living in Greece would be offered Greek citizenship; this promise was repeated in subsequent months by Alternate and Deputy Foreign Ministers George Papandreou and Giannos Kranidiotis. However, the government took no steps to carry out this promise. Naturalization for Greek Jews and descendants who lost citizenship are possible due to law change in 2011 and 2017. Consulates received guidance on who to apply the new laws according to letter Αθήνα, 3/11/2017 Αριθ. Πρωτ.: 34255/17. (Φ.132445).

== Dual citizenship ==
Greece allows its citizens to hold foreign citizenship in addition to their Greek citizenship.

Some countries (such as Japan) do not permit dual citizenships. Therefore, adults who acquired Greek citizenship (or any other citizenship) and Japanese citizenship by jus sanguinis must declare before turning 22 as to which citizenship they wish to keep. This however is a requirement of Japanese nationality law, not Greek nationality law. If the person declares they wish to keep Japanese citizenship and renounce their Greece citizenship to Japanese authorities, this has no effect on their Greek citizenship as far as Greece is concerned and they can effectively keep both.

== Citizenship of the European Union ==
Because Greece forms part of the European Union, Greek citizens are also citizens of the European Union under European Union law and thus enjoy rights of free movement and have the right to vote in elections for the European Parliament. When in a non-EU country where there is no Greek embassy, Greek citizens have the right to get consular protection from the embassy of any other EU country present in that country. Greek citizens can live and work in any country within the EU as a result of the right of free movement and residence granted in Article 21 of the EU Treaty.

== Travel freedom of Greek citizens ==
Visa requirements for Greek citizens

Visa requirements for Greek citizens are administrative entry restrictions by the authorities of other states placed on citizens of Greece. In 2017, Greek citizens had visa-free or visa on arrival access to 171 countries and territories, ranking the Greek passport 6th in the world according to the Visa Restrictions Index.

In 2017, the Greek nationality is ranked twenty-first in Nationality Index (QNI). This index differs from the Visa Restrictions Index, which focuses on external factors including travel freedom. The QNI considers, in addition, to travel freedom on internal factors such as peace & stability, economic strength, and human development as well.
