= Banking in Switzerland =

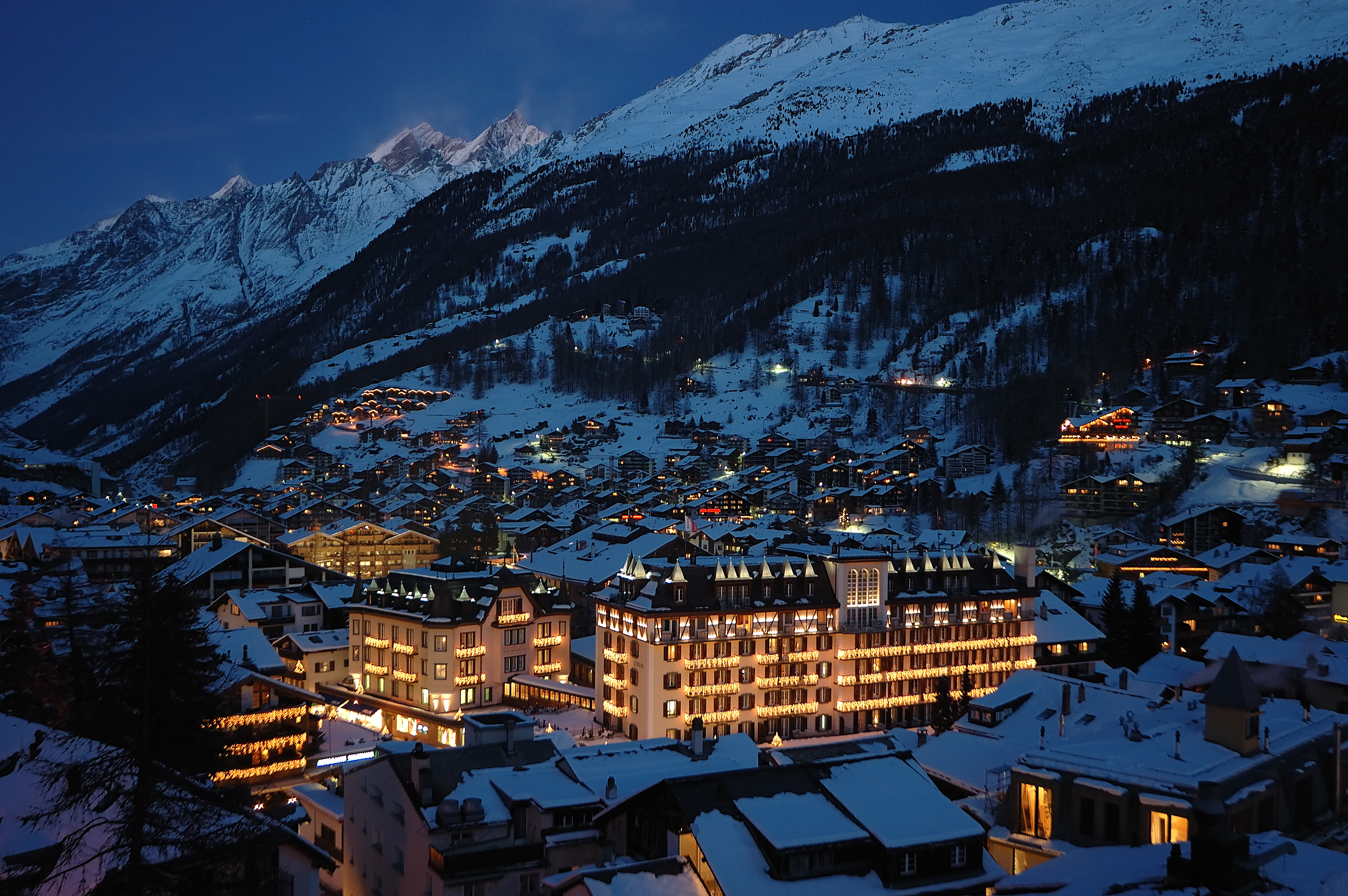
The Mont Cervin Palace in Zermatt. A hub of tourism, the city is serviced by many private banks. Underground bunkers and storage facilities for gold are maintained at the foothills of the Swiss Alps.

Banking in Switzerland dates to the early 18th century through Switzerland's merchant trade and over the centuries has grown into a complex and regulated international industry. Banking is seen as emblematic of Switzerland and the country has been one of the largest, if not largest, offshore financial centers and tax havens in the world since the mid-20th century, with a long history of banking secrecy, security and client confidentiality reaching back to the early 1700s. Starting as a way to protect wealthy European banking interests, Swiss banking secrecy was codified in 1934 with the passage of a landmark federal law, the Federal Act on Banks and Savings Banks. These laws were used to protect assets of persons being persecuted by Nazi authorities but have also been used by people and institutions seeking to illegally evade taxes, hide assets, or to commit other financial crime.

Controversial protection of foreign accounts and assets during World War II sparked a series of proposed financial regulations seeking to limit bank secrecy, but with little resulting action. Despite various international efforts to roll back banking secrecy laws in the country which were largely minimized or reverted by Swiss social and political forces, in 2017 Switzerland agreed to "automatic exchange of information" (AEOI) with foreign governments and their revenue services regarding information of depositors not resident in Switzerland. This constituted de facto the end of Swiss banking secrecy for depositors who were not Swiss residents. Furthermore, after Switzerland ratified the Foreign Account Tax Compliance Act agreement with the United States, because of concerns regarding their tax liability (the U.S. taxes its citizens regardless of whether they are resident in the U.S. or not) some Swiss banks have gone so far as to close accounts held by US citizens, and to ban the opening of new accounts by US citizens and by dual US-Swiss citizens, including those deemed lawful permanent Swiss residents. Thus banking secrecy remains in force only for those residing in and solely taxable in Switzerland.

Disclosing client information has been considered by Switzerland a criminal offence since the early 1900s. Employees working in Switzerland and at Swiss banks abroad have "long adhered to an unwritten code similar to that observed by doctors or priests". Since 1934 Swiss banking secrecy laws have been violated to a major extent by only four people, namely: Christoph Meili (1997), Bradley Birkenfeld (2007), Rudolf Elmer (2011) and Hervé Falciani (2014).

The Swiss Bankers Association (SBA) estimated in 2018 that Swiss banks held US$6.5 trillion in assets or 25% of all global cross-border assets. Switzerland's main lingual hubs, Geneva (for French), Lugano (for Italian), and Zürich (for German) service the different geographical markets. It currently ranks number two behind the United States and on par with Singapore in the Financial Secrecy Index. The banks are regulated by the Swiss Financial Market Supervisory Authority (FINMA) and the Swiss National Bank (SNB) which derives its authority from a series of federal statutes. Banking in Switzerland has historically played, and still continues to play, a dominant role in the Swiss economy and society. According to the Organisation for Economic Co-operation and Development (OECD), total banking assets amount to 467% of total gross domestic product. Banking in Switzerland has been portrayed, with varying degrees of accuracy, in overall popular culture and television shows.

Switzerland's credibility as a banking centre was hurt in 2023 after the collapse of Credit Suisse, one of the largest Swiss banks, which was subsequently acquired by its Swiss competitor UBS. However, the rapid action taken by the Federal Council, the Swiss National Bank, and FINMA helped to minimise further damage.

== History ==
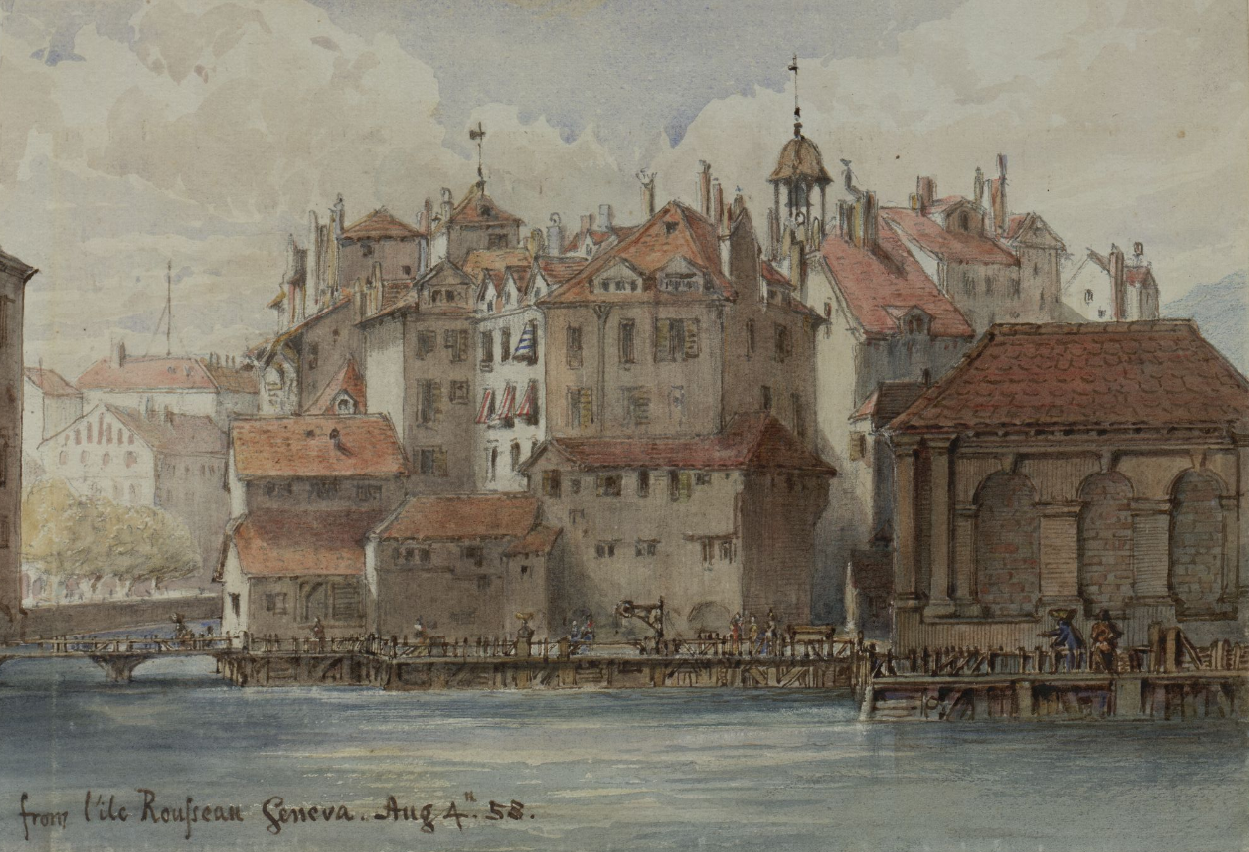
Many Swiss banking practices, including secrecy, trace their origins to Geneva in the 18th century.

Bank secrecy in the Swiss region can be traced to the Great Council of Geneva, which outlawed the disclosure of information about the European upper class in 1713. During the 1780s, Swiss bank accounts began insuring deposits, which contributed to their reputation for financial security. In 1815, the Congress of Vienna formally established Switzerland's international neutrality, which led to a large capital influx. The wealthy, landlocked Switzerland saw banking secrecy as a way to build an empire similar to that of France, Spain, and the United Kingdom. Swiss historian Sébastian Guex notes in The Origins of Secret Swiss Bank Accounts:

This is what the Swiss bourgeoisie are thinking: "That's our future. We will play on the contradictions between the European powers and, protected by the shield of our neutrality, our arm will be industry and finance."

After a small scale civil war in the 1840s between the Swiss cantons, the Swiss Federation was founded in 1848. The formation of the state, through a direct democracy, contributed to the political stability needed for banking secrecy. The mountainous terrain of Switzerland provided a natural environment in which to excavate underground vaults for storage of gold and diamonds. In the 1910s, during World War I, Swiss bankers traveled to France to advertise the country's banking secrecy. According to Sébastien Guex, the banks printed "brochures, circulars, personalised letters, and advertising in newspapers, and sent representatives who approached their clientele in person". The war's contribution to political and economic instability sparked a rapid capital movement into Switzerland. As France and Germany introduced progressive income and inheritance taxes for the first time, taxing greater wealth at higher rates to finance the war, wealthy clients moved their holdings into Swiss accounts to avoid taxation. The French banked in Geneva, the Italians in Lugano, and the Germans in Zürich.

The Federal Act on Banks and Savings Banks, colloquially known as the Banking Law of 1934, made the violation of banking secrecy a federal criminal offence. That major step beyond the prior enforcement of banking secrecy under civil law resulted from several developments of the early 1930s, including the introduction in the same legislation of an embryonic form of banking supervision, which Swiss bankers argued could endanger secrecy; evolving jurisprudence of the Federal Supreme Court; and a 1932 campaign against tax evasion in France led by Édouard Herriot's government, following a financial scandal that erupted in France in that year, involving thousands of wealthy French citizens and the Commercial Bank of Basel (Banque commerciale de Bâle–BCB). In a hotel apartment in Paris, the police discovered that the director and other officials of the aforementioned Swiss bank were providing information to important members of the French financial elite on how to transfer their money to Switzerland, in order to obtain untaxed returns. Alleged wealthy French tax evaders included military generals and Catholic bishops. An additional provision, Article 47(b), was drafted before its ratification to protect Jewish assets from the Nazi party.

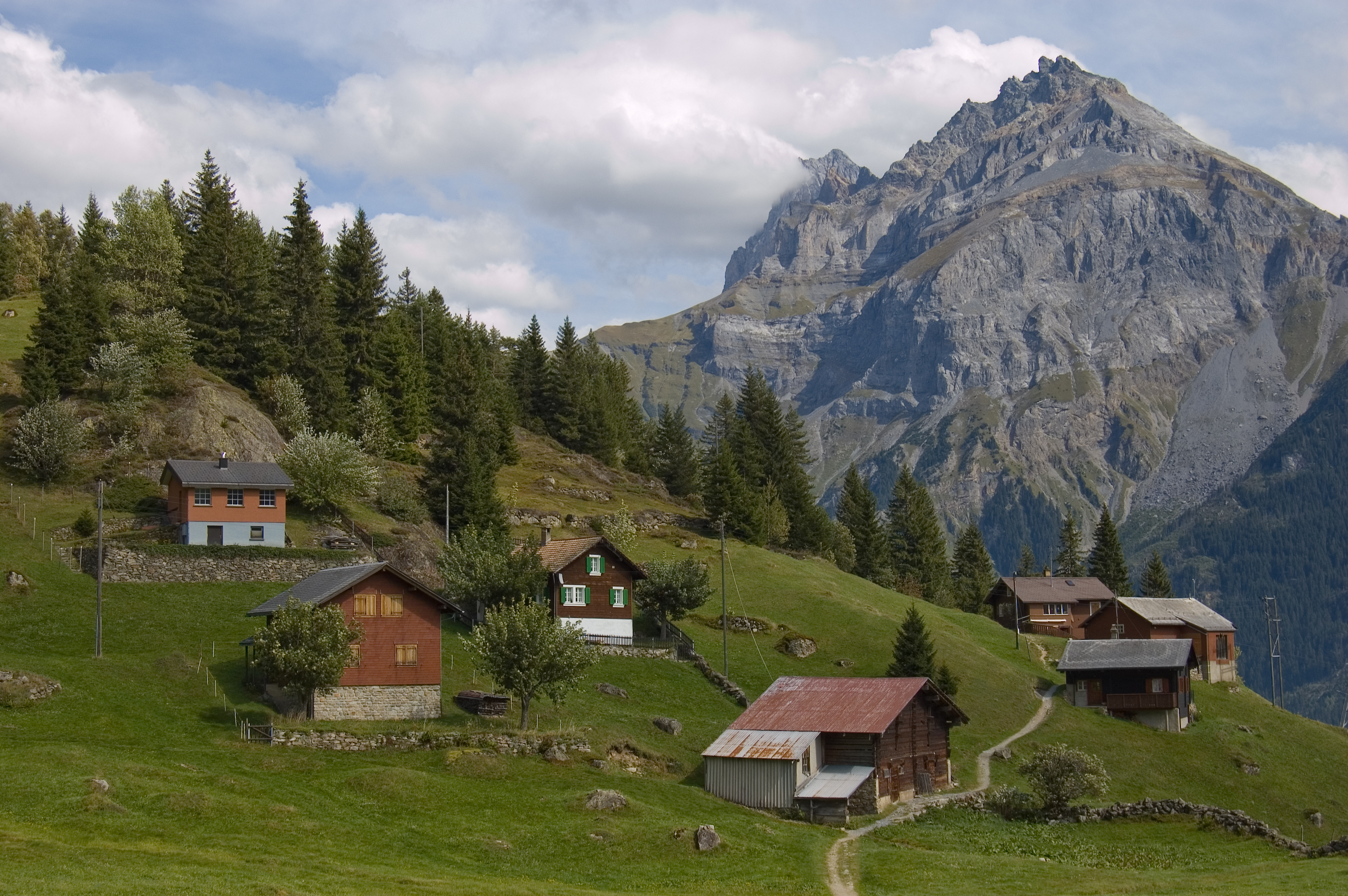
Switzerland's mountainous terrain helps to store gold in underground bunkers.

During World War II, Switzerland remained diplomatically neutral but its economy and financial system served the Axis powers by storing gold and cash balances in underground vaults, buying gold from the Nazi German state, and lending to both Germany and Italy, thus supporting their aggressive endeavors. Adolf Hitler maintained an account at the Union Bank of Switzerland (UBS) estimated at 1.1 billion ℛ︁ℳ︁. After the United States formally asked the bank to transfer the money in the 1990s, UBS wired US$400 to 700 million worth of Reichsmarks to U.S. authorities. Banking regulations in Switzerland limit the amount of orphaned assets allowed to leave a bank's custody. UBS, with consent from the Swiss government, froze the account containing Hitler's assets indefinitely, and clipped the Reichsmarks, stripping the currency of value. During World War II, UBS also maintained accounts for hundreds of German Jewish businesspeople and households. After the Banking Law of 1934 was passed, the bank aggressively protected assets of the "enemies of Nazi Germany". When Hitler announced an (aborted) invasion of Switzerland in 1940, UBS contracted the Swiss Armed Forces to blockade their retail banks and transport Jewish assets to underground military bunkers.The Swiss Bank Corporation (SBC) and Credit Suisse, did likewise. However, after the war, many of these account holders had been killed in the Holocaust, and their heirs often lacked the documentation required to claim the accounts. For decades, Swiss banks were accused of failing to return the money to rightful heirs, destroying records or placing excessive bureaucratic obstacles in the way of claims, and profiting from dormant accounts. This ended when the Volcker Commission reached a paltry $1.25 billion settlement with the victims.

=== World War II and beyond ===
After the end of World War II, Switzerland and its financial system benefited greatly from having remained unharmed while all the neighbouring economies were devastated, but had to face the reputational damage from its support to the Axis powers, which also led to threats to banking secrecy as the Allied victors sought to expropriate Nazi assets held under Swiss custody. By and large, the Swiss banking sector was able to successfully deflect the threat to its secrecy practices, not least as it supported France and the United Kingdom with significant lending. When British politician George Brown blamed "gnomes of Zurich" for a weak pound sterling in 1964, Swiss bankers began using the title as proof of their financial skill and adherence to secrecy. Throughout the 1980s and 1990s, numerous international proposals for bank secrecy rollbacks were made by foreign states with little success.

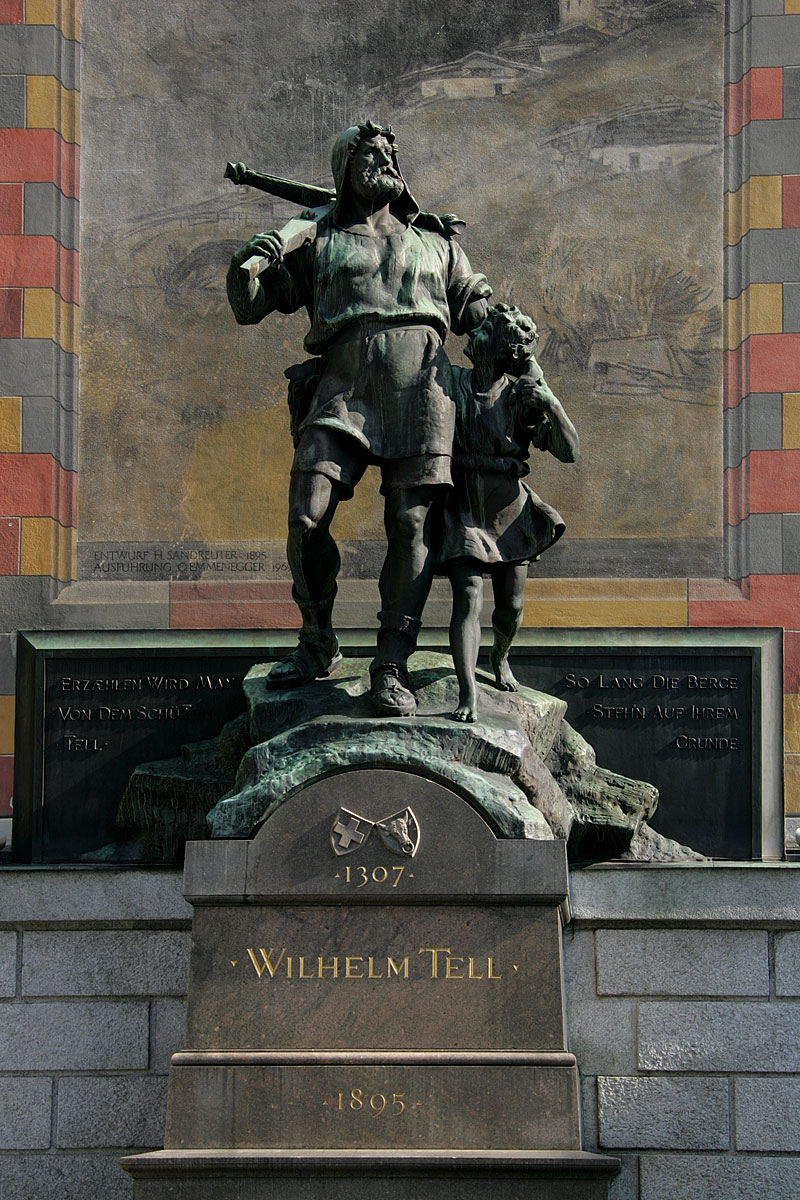
International pressure to roll back banking secrecy is seen as an attack on Swiss culture and values. The Swiss parliament expressed an interest in adopting banking secrecy into their constitution in 2017.

After the 2008 financial crisis, Switzerland signed the European Union Savings Directive (EUSD) which obliges Swiss banks to report to 43 European countries non-identifying annual tax statistics. On December 3, 2008, the Federal Assembly increased the prison sentence for violations of banking secrecy from a maximum of six months to five years. In late 2008, after an international, multi-state investigation into Switzerland's role in U.S. tax evasion, UBS entered into a limited, deferred prosecution agreement (DPA) with the U.S. Department of Justice. The agreement initiated the landmark Birkenfeld Disclosure of information on more than 4,000 clients.

If there is anything the Swiss take more seriously than the precision of their watches or the quality of their chocolate, it's the secrecy of their banks.

— Steve Kroft, host of Banking: A Crack In the Swiss Vault

In November 2013, the Zürcher Kantonalbank was classified as a systemically important bank in Switzerland by order of the Swiss National Bank (SNB), alongside UBS, Credit Suisse, Raiffeisen (Switzerland) and PostFinance, and must meet stricter capital requirements and prepare contingency plans for times of crisis. In another step toward loosening banking secrecy, Switzerland signed the U.S. Foreign Account Tax Compliance Act (FATCA), after rejecting it twice in parliament. The FATCA requires Swiss banks to disclose non-identifying U.S. client information annually to the Internal Revenue Service. The agreement does not guarantee the semi-automatic information transfers, which remain at the discretion of Swiss government authorities. If a client does not consent to having their information shared with the IRS, Swiss law prohibits the disclosure. If a client does consent, Swiss banks send the IRS tax-related information about the account holder but are prohibited from disclosing identities pursuant to Article 47 of the Banking Law of 1934. The 2018 Financial Secrecy Index stated: "this [does] not mean that Swiss banking secrecy was finished, as some excitable news reports suggest... the breach was a partial [dent]".

In March 2015, the Swiss government entered into bilateral "Rubik Agreements" with Germany, Austria, and the United Kingdom allowing foreign holders of Swiss bank accounts to retain their anonymity in exchange for paying predetermined back taxes. Switzerland adopted the International Convention on the Automatic Exchange of Banking Information (AEOI) in 2017, agreeing to automatically release limited financial information to certain countries for the sole purpose of tax auditing. This agreement includes the Common Reporting Standard (CRS) which obliges Swiss banks to automatically send foreign tax authorities the client's name, address, domicile, tax number, date of birth, account number, account balance at years end, and the gross investment income. The CRS does not, however, override the Swiss Banking Law of 1934, so the client's expenses (withdrawals) and investments are not disclosed. Thus tax authorities cannot "go fishing" for tax evaders, they must directly link a financial crime to the client's account. The disclosed information can only be used for tax auditing and Swiss authorities may prevent disclosure.

In December 2017, the Swiss parliament launched a standing initiative and expressed an interest in formally embedding banking secrecy within the Swiss Constitution, making it a federally-protected constitutional right. In January 2018, a U.S. district court ruled that Swiss bankers "[have] nothing to do with the choice that an American taxpayer makes to not declare offshore assets", later clarifying they should not be seen as facilitating tax evasion but rather provide a legal service that is made illegal by the client. The Swiss Justice Ministry announced in March 2018 that disclosure of client information in a pending court case involving a Swiss bank is subject to federal espionage and extortion charges in addition to charges relating to banking secrecy laws.

After a serious crisis, on 19 March 2023, following negotiations with the Swiss government, UBS announced its intent to acquire Credit Suisse for $3.25 billion (CHF 3 billion) in order to prevent the bank's collapse. UBS completed the acquisition in June 2023.

== Banking and the Swiss economy ==
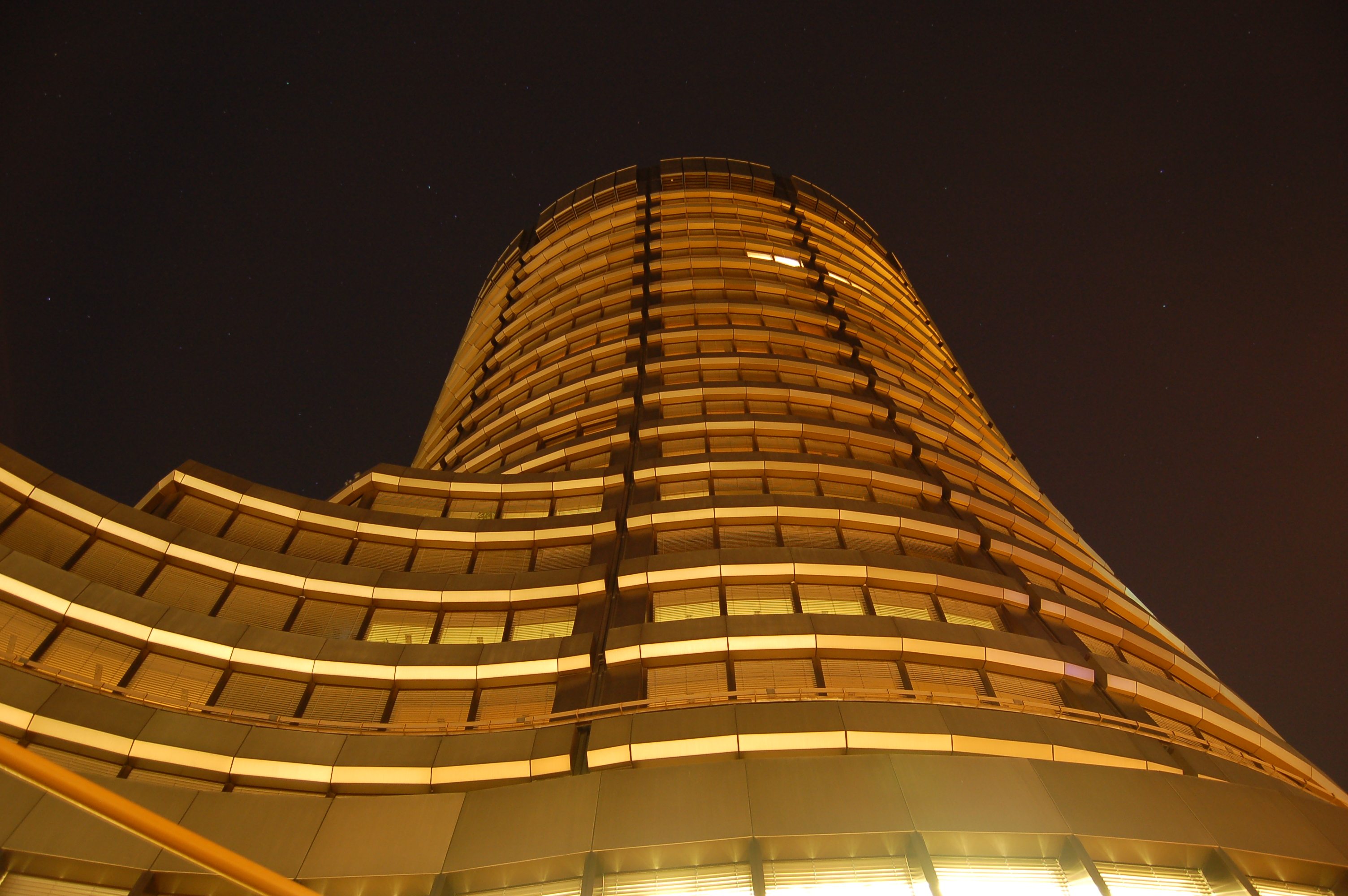
Worldwide headquarters of the Bank for International Settlements in Basel

Switzerland is a prosperous nation with a per capita gross domestic product higher than that of most Western European nations. The value of the Swiss franc (CHF) has been relatively stable compared with that of many others. Swiss neutrality and national sovereignty, long recognized by foreign nations, have fostered a stable environment for the banking sector to develop and thrive. Switzerland maintained neutrality through both World Wars, is not a member of the European Union or NATO, and did not join the United Nations until 2002. The Bank of International Settlements (BIS), an organization that facilitates cooperation among the world's central banks, is headquartered in Basel. Founded in 1930, the BIS chose to locate in Switzerland because of the country's neutrality, which was important to the organization founded by countries that had been enemies in World War I.

Banking has played a dominant role in the Swiss economy for two centuries. According to the Organisation for Economic Co-operation and Development (OECD), total banking assets amount to 467% of total gross domestic product.

Swiss banks managed $2.4 trillion (CHF2.1 trillion) of assets belonging to wealthy foreigners in 2022, more than any other country and before Hong Kong ($2.2T) or Singapore ($1.5T) who are ranked 2nd and 3rd respectively, according to the study conducted by the Boston Consulting Group.

=== Origin of funds ===
Most of the wealth from overseas in Switzerland originates in Germany, France and Saudi Arabia (2018). According to the Swiss Bankers Association in 2022, the amount held by Russian clients in Swiss banks is between CHF150 and CHF200 billion ($160 and $214 billion). The holding of the Rothschilds assets is located in Zurich, said by insiders to be worth "trillions" according to The Independent (UK) journal and others.

== Regulation ==
The Swiss Financial Market Supervisory Authority (FINMA) is a public law institution that supervises most banking-related activities as well as securities markets and investment funds. Regulatory authority is derived from the Swiss Financial Market Supervision Act (FINMASA) and Article 98 of the Swiss Federal Constitution. The office of the Swiss Banking Ombudsman, founded in 1993, is sponsored by the Swiss Banking Ombudsman Foundation, which was established by the Swiss Bankers Association. The ombudsman's services, which are offered free of charge, include mediation and assistance to persons searching for dormant assets. The ombudsman handles about 1,500 complaints raised against banks yearly. Generally speaking, lawyers will not work against the banks and regulators are "too weak" to act in case of a problem, according to the Financial Times of London. Swiss law recognizes foreign trusts.

=== Automatic exchange of tax information ===
In February 2013, the Swiss Federal Council allowed the signing of the Foreign Account Tax Compliance Act (FATCA) with the US. These agreements force all Swiss banks to inform the Internal Revenue Service of undeclared, offshore accounts. These new regulations are applicable from 2014, and in turn assure Swiss banks of continued operations within the US.

In July 2019, the US Senate approved the Double Taxation Treaty (DTA) with Switzerland, which had already been accepted by the Swiss parliament in 2010. The new agreement, applicable to accounts from September 23, 1999, onward, amends the tax treaty of 1996 and regulates requests for information on financial accounts by US authorities, as well as exemptions for retirement savings by US persons.

Starting in 2019, Switzerland began to share (with the country of origin or residence) the details of 3.1 million bank accounts held by foreigners, as part of the agreed automatic exchange of information. Swiss banks, insurance companies and trusts have a legal obligation to comply but charitable Swiss foundations are so far exempt. As of 2019, Switzerland received financial data from 75 countries and shared data with 63 (over 100 countries starting in 2023) representing 3.6 million accounts as of 2023. Around 9000 banks, insurers, trusts and other financial institutions in Switzerland provide this information to the Swiss authorities.

=== Loopholes ===
Swiss banks are obliged to reject or terminate business relationships if there are doubts about the real identity of the owner of the account. Swiss banks have a legal obligation to record the ultimate beneficial owners of all assets they handle worldwide, but doing so accurately can be tricky in jurisdictions where it is easy for third parties to mask who the owners are. Thus, loopholes exist through the use of shell companies, trust funds, and proxy directors signing the paperwork without owning the assets.

Similarly, the use of a "straw man" or a family member is a way also to hide the true beneficial ownership in some cases.

Loopholes exist also with people with multiple nationalities who only declare one citizenship to the authorities for the purpose of tax reporting.

Another loophole consists (for US citizens) in setting up shell companies abroad and registering them with the IRS as "offshore financial institutions". The IRS issues the entities unique Global Intermediary Identification Numbers, or GIINs, which relieve the banks of FATCA's requirement to investigate whether they're held by Americans. This loophole was allegedly used by billionaire Robert Brockman to avoid taxation.

The banking systems of Switzerland and Liechtenstein have close ties. Liechtenstein's trust companies are clients of Swiss banks. Liechtenstein does not require trust companies to identify people with signatory powers, and does not prosecute tax evasion or tax fraud (2000).

==== Reforms ====
To improve the tracking down and freezing of assets, Swiss NGO Public Eye has called for a national task force, a register of the beneficial owners of front companies and a reporting obligation for lawyers. The Tax Justice Network and FATF made similar recommendations in 2018, including breaking up the Big Four accounting firms. As of 2022, the Swiss government is following up on some of those recommendations. In addition, Transparency International is demanding that lawyers, financial advisors plus real estate and art transactions be subject to the same exacting anti-money laundering measures as banks. However, in 2025, the Swiss parliament has pushed back on many of these reforms on grounds of "competitiveness" for the Swiss banking sector. In October 2026, Switzerland plans to create a central register of the beneficial owners of assets held through shell companies to counter money laundering (available to the authorities only). Transparency International says the reform is not going far enough and contains many loopholes.

=== Enabling industry ===
The "enabling industry" refers to lawyers, fiduciaries, notaries, and real estate agents who assist criminals in investing or hiding their ill-gotten wealth. Their activity is not covered by the Swiss Anti-Money Laundering Act as long as they are only advising clients to place money in a particular financial institution or country. Furthermore, lawyers in Switzerland can refuse to disclose almost anything to the authorities about their clients.

Under the Swiss Anti-Money Laundering Act, banks must report suspicious clients and transactions to the authorities. Lawyers and other advisors have no such obligation if they simply create trusts and other constructs rather than handle assets.

According to the Money Laundering Reporting Office Switzerland in 2017, official "suspicious activity reports" reached nearly 4,700 (worth $16.2 billion) up from 2,909 reported cases in 2016. Suspicious activity reports increased to 21,000 in 2025. According to FINMA in 2023, 50 percent of Swiss banks had “largely unsatisfactory” anti-money laundering systems.

The Swiss Financial Services Act of 2020 (FinSA) requires financial advisers to obtain a licence (950 firms advising on nearly $200 billion have been approved by FINMA). The law also requires any "retrocession" paid by the bank to the advisor to be disclosed publicly.

=== Assets seizure ===
Under current rules, banking institutions and cantonal authorities can only report what is in their registers; looking into the origins of assets or connections between individuals is not permitted. For example, in 2022, a Russian oligarch reportedly handed his Swiss company over to his wife to avoid the sanctions against Russia.

Swiss authorities can freeze assets if the law requires them to. However, seizing assets is only permitted in cases involving crime or for destituted potentates.

At least a dozen destitute autocrats have had their assets frozen or seized by the Swiss government over the years. The amounts can be counted in billions of dollars. According to the Swiss media, some of the amounts have not yet been restituted to the people of the countries of origin to whom it properly belongs.

== Protections ==
Breaches of banking secrecy laws in Switzerland are automatically processed pursuant to Article 47 of the Banking Law of 1934: those who disclose client information are subject to a maximum of five years' imprisonment and 250,000 francs (€215,000 or US$250,000) in fines. Whistleblowers and leakers of client information often face hostility from the public and sustain professional setbacks. Denounced as a criminal in Switzerland, a federal arrest warrant has been in place for Bradley Birkenfeld since 2008, after he disclosed UBS client information to the U.S. Internal Revenue Service in 2007. After the 2008 financial crisis, the Swiss Parliament initiated a series of international tax treaties that rolled back banking secrecy protections for foreign clients in response to pressure from the European Union, United States, and United Kingdom.

== Major banks ==
As of 2018, there are more than 400 securities dealers and banking institutions in Switzerland, ranging from the "Two Big Banks" down to small banks serving the needs of a single community or a few special clients. The largest and second largest Swiss banks are UBS Group AG and Credit Suisse Group AG, respectively. They account for over 50% of all deposits in Switzerland; each has extensive branch networks throughout the country and most international centers. Due to their size and complexity, UBS and Credit Suisse are subject to an extra degree of supervision from the Federal Banking Commission.

As of 2023 only one in five Swiss people banks with either UBS or Credit Suisse, but most Swiss prefer one or the other. Credit Suisse was historically the bank of Protestant Zürich; UBS originated in Catholic Basel, near France.

=== Swiss National Bank ===
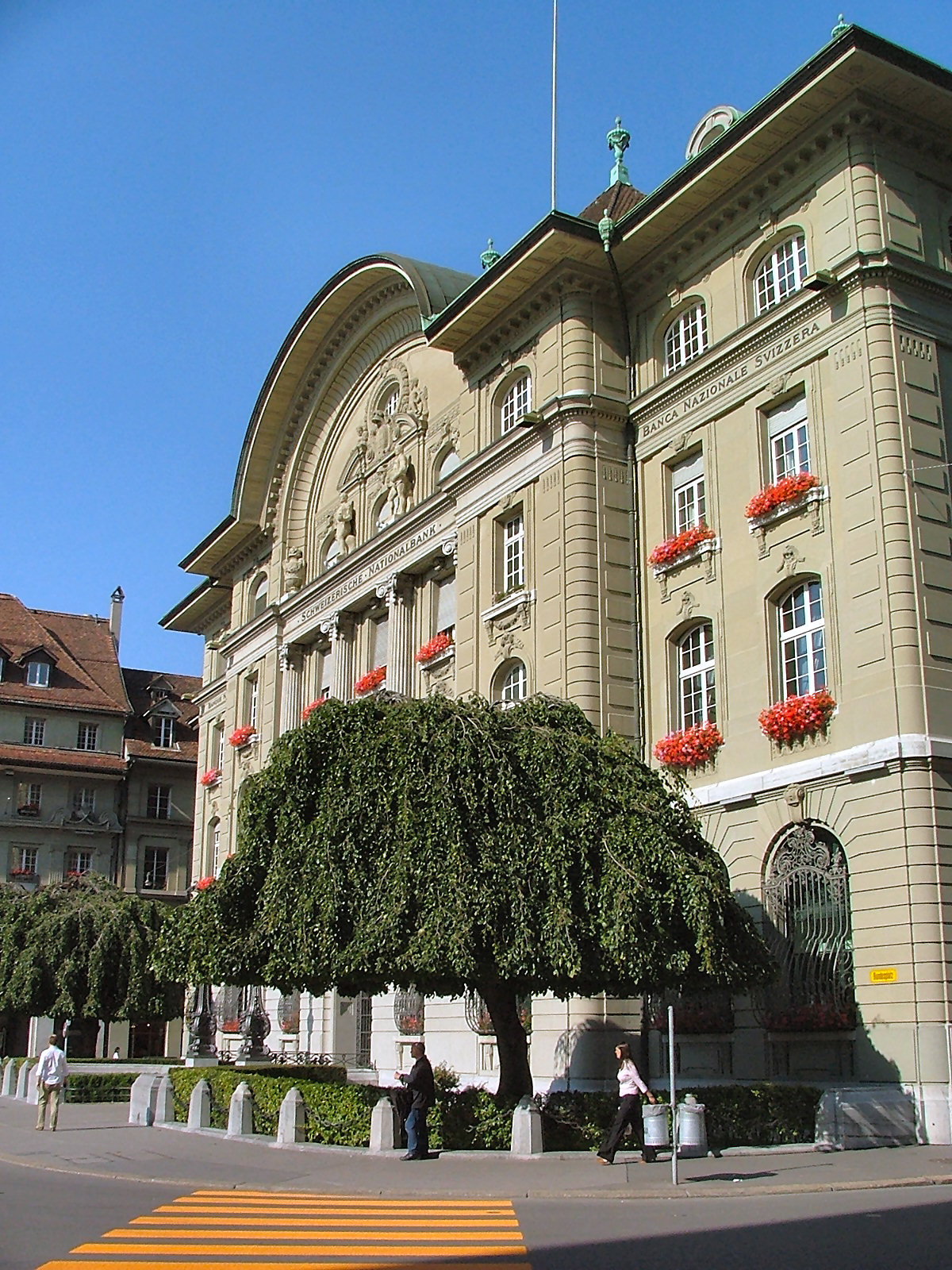
The central bank of Switzerland, the Swiss National Bank (SNB), is headquartered in Bern.

The Swiss National Bank (SNB) serves as the country's central bank. Founded by the Federal Act on the Swiss National Bank (16 January 1906), it began conducting business on 20 June 1907. Its shares are publicly traded, and are held by the cantons, cantonal banks, and individual investors; the federal government does not hold any shares. Although a central bank often has regulatory authority over the country's banking system, the SNB does not; regulation is solely the role of the Federal Banking Commission.

Raiffeisen Banks "assumes the role of central bank" in providing treasury services, and is the third largest group consisting of 328 banks in 2011, 390 in 2012 with 1,155 branches. According to the bank in 2012 non-U.S. businesses of Wegelin & Co, the oldest Swiss bank, would be bought by the Raiffeisen group. The group has 3 million plus clients within Switzerland.

=== UBS ===
Capital ownership of UBS by country of origin as of 2014
1. Switzerland (19.5%)
2. United States (10.6%)
3. United Kingdom (16.8%)
4. Asia-Pacific-Singapore (9.70%)
5. Germany (0.70%)
6. Others (42.7%)

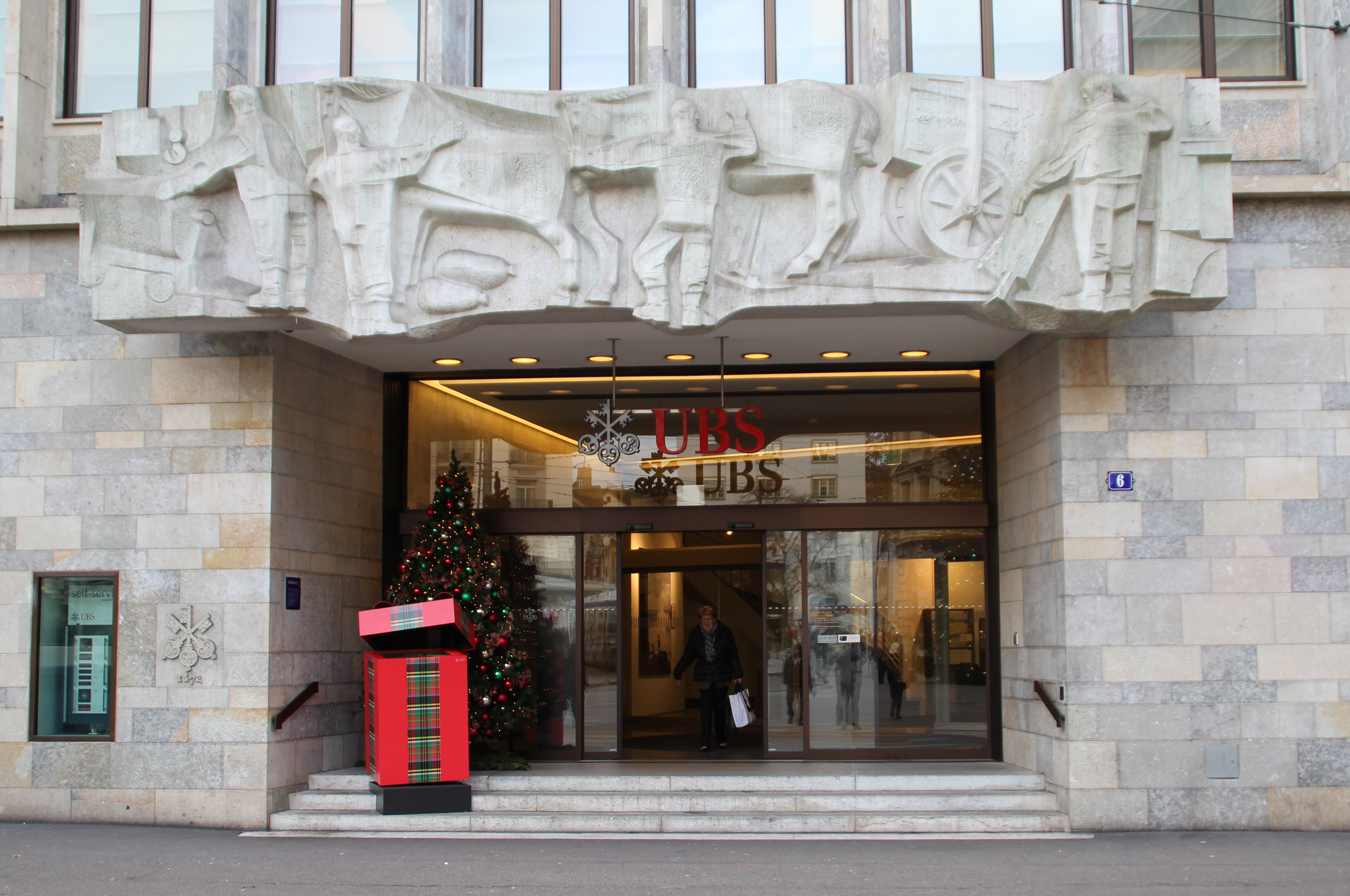
The largest bank in Switzerland: UBS

UBS Group AG came into existence in June 1998, when Union Bank of Switzerland, founded in 1862, and Swiss Bank Corporation, founded in 1872, merged. Headquartered in Zürich and Basel, it is Switzerland's largest bank. It maintains seven main offices around the world (four in the United States and one each in London, Tokyo, and Hong Kong) and branches on five continents. UBS has been at the center of various tax evasion investigations and other criminal investigations since its founding. UBS was fined $100 million by the Federal Reserve in 2004 for trading in dollars with Iran and other sanctioned countries.

=== Credit Suisse ===
Credit Suisse Group was the second-largest Swiss bank. Based in Zürich and founded in 1856, Credit Suisse offers private banking, investment banking and asset management services. It acquired the First Boston Corporation in 1988 and merged with the Winterthur insurance company in 1997; the latter was sold to Axa in 2006. The asset management services were sold to Aberdeen Asset Management during the 2008 financial crisis. Credit Suisse has been at the center of various tax evasion investigations or money laundering activities since its founding. Credit Suisse collapsed in 2023 and it was acquired by UBS the same year.

=== Private banks ===
The term private bank refers to a bank that offers private banking services and in its legal form is a partnership. The first private banks were created in St. Gallen in the mid-18th century and in Geneva in the late 18th century as partnerships, and some are still in the hands of the original families such as Hottinger and Pictet. In Switzerland, such private banks are called "private bankers" (in the local languages, a protected term) to distinguish them from the other private banks which are typically shared corporations. Historically in Switzerland a minimum of CHF1 million was required to open an account, however, over the last years many private banks have lowered their entry hurdles to CHF250,000 for private investors.

=== Cantonal banks ===
There are, as of 2006, 24 cantonal banks; these banks are state-guaranteed semi-governmental organizations controlled by one of Switzerland's 26 cantons that engage in all banking businesses. Together the cantonal banks account for about 30% of the banking sector in Switzerland, with a network of over 800 branches and 16 000 employees in Switzerland. In 2014 consolidated total assets of all cantonal banks accounted around 500 bln CHF, which is comparable with those of one the "Big Banks", UBS and Credit Suisse. The largest cantonal bank, the Zurich Cantonal Bank, has approximately 5 000 employees had a 2005 net income of CHF810 million.

== Controversies ==
=== World War II ===
In 1996 and 1997, a series of class action lawsuits were filed in several United States federal courts against Swiss banks and other Swiss entities, alleging that financial institutions in Switzerland collaborated with and aided the Nazi Regime by knowingly retaining and concealing assets of Holocaust victims, and by accepting and laundering illegally obtained Nazi loot and profits of slave labor. The resulting Volcker Commission and agreement brokered therefrom resulted in a $1.25 billion restitution to Holocaust victims.

=== Banking secrecy ===
[Banking secrecy] is comparable to medical confidentiality ... [Switzerland] must absolutely respect the private sphere ... [no one should] know what there is in your bank account.

— Ueli Maurer, former President of Switzerland in 2013

Switzerland, considered the "grandfather of bank secrecy", has been one of the largest offshore financial centers and tax havens in the world since the mid-20th century. Despite an international push to meaningfully roll back banking secrecy laws in the country, Swiss political forces have minimized and reverted many of the proposed rollbacks. Disclosing client information has been considered a serious social and criminal offense since the early 1900s. Whistleblowers, despite legal protections, often face professional setbacks in Switzerland. Swiss bankers who maintain offices exclusively in Switzerland are shielded from a foreign state's lawsuits, extradition requests, and criminal charges, as long as they remain within the country's legal jurisdiction. In spite of minor adjustments to bank secrecy, bankers working in Switzerland and abroad at Swiss banks have long adhered to an unwritten code similar to that observed by doctors or priests. Switzerland's main lingual hubs, Geneva (for French), Lugano (for Italian), and Zürich (for German) service the different geographical markets. It consistently ranks in the top three states on the Financial Secrecy Index and was named first many times, most recently in 2018. The Swiss Bankers Association estimated in 2018 that Swiss banks held US$6.5 trillion in assets or 25% of all global cross-border assets. These secrecy laws have linked the Swiss banking system with individuals and institutions seeking to illegally evade taxes, hide assets, or generally commit financial crime.

Secrecy laws have been violated by four people since 1934: Christoph Meili (1997), Bradley Birkenfeld (2007), Rudolf Elmer (2011), and Hervé Falciani (2014). In all four cases, the whistleblowers were served with federal arrest warrants, fined, and sustained professional setbacks in Switzerland.

As of 2015, Swiss banking secrecy was considered "dead" because of FATCA, but according to the Tax Justice Network in 2018, these schemes are "full of loopholes and shortcomings" which can still be exploited by lawyers to hide the assets of their clients. Additionally, some autocratic or developing countries have no automatic exchange of tax information with Switzerland.

In 2022, the Helsinki Commission of the U.S. Congress stated:

Long known as a destination for war criminals and kleptocrats to stash their plunder, Switzerland is a leading enabler of Russian dictator Vladimir Putin and his cronies. After looting Russia, Putin and his oligarchs use Swiss secrecy laws to hide and protect the proceeds of their crimes.

==== Freedom of the press ====
Since leaking financial data is a criminal offense in Switzerland (even if it is in the public interest) punishable with up to five years in jail, Swiss media argued in February 2022 that the banking secrecy law runs contrary to freedom of speech and freedom of the press in some cases. In 2022, the United Nations Human Rights Council asked for a better protection of journalists and whistleblowers in this regard.

==== Bank vaults and bunkers ====
A handful of larger Swiss banks operate undisclosed or otherwise secretive bank vaults, storage facilities or underground bunkers for gold bars, diamonds, or other valuable physical assets. Most of these underground bunkers are located near or at the foothills of the mountainous regions of the Swiss Alps. These facilities are not subject to the same banking regulations as banks in Switzerland and do not have to report holdings to regulatory agencies. The Swiss defense department estimates that of the ten former military bunkers available for sale, six of them were sold to Swiss banks to house assets during the 1980s and 1990s. Storage in these underground bunkers and bank vaults is typically reserved for clients who pass a multi-stage security clearance. Some of these bunkers are not accessible by road or foot and require aircraft transportation.

==== Numbered bank accounts ====
Many banks in Switzerland offer clients numbered bank accounts, accounts where the identity of the holder is replaced with a multi-digit number known only to the client and select private bankers. Although these accounts do add another layer of banking secrecy, they are not completely anonymous as the name of the client is still recorded by the bank and subject to limited, warranted disclosure. Some Swiss banks supplement the number with a code name such as "Cardinal", "Octopussy" or "Cello" that provides an alternative means of identifying the client. However, to open this type of account in Switzerland, clients must pass a multi-stage clearance procedure and prove to the bank the lawful origins of their assets.

=== Connection to illegal activities ===
Swiss banks have served as safe havens for the wealth of dictators, despots, mobsters, arms dealers, corrupt officials, and tax cheats of all kinds.

Historically, mobster Meyer Lansky, Vatican-linked banker Licio Gelli of the lodge "P2" in Italy, and Mexican president Carlos Salinas's family amongst others, have reportedly used Swiss banks to launder money over the years.

Swiss banks have been commonly identified as holding ill-gotten Nazi gold. The Swiss National Bank, the largest gold distribution centre in continental Europe before the war, was the logical venue through which Nazi Germany could dispose of its gold.

Time magazine reported that throughout 1981 and 1982, the Israelis reportedly set up Swiss bank accounts to handle the financial end of the annual multi-million dollars arms deals between Iran and Israel during the Iran–Iraq War.

According to the Swiss Federal Prosecutor's office and media, during the 1990s and early 2000s Al Qaeda members had accounts at Swiss banks, including at UBS.

Switzerland finally released a total of $683 million in Marcos funds to the Philippines Treasury in 2004.

Mark Pieth, a Swiss professor of criminal law, said Mobutu of Zaire had stolen US$30 billion over his 30 years in power but much of it he used to oil the wheels of power and pay off political and military allies. Billions were hidden in Swiss bank accounts illegally.

According to Haitian authorities, Jean Claude Duvalier had nearly $300 million of Haitian people's money hidden in Swiss bank accounts.

Then-Nigerian President Sani Abacha is said to have stolen over a billion dollars in the 90's from his country, some of it hidden in Swiss bank accounts.

In 2013, the International Consortium of Investigative Journalists (ICIJ), a Washington, D.C.–based nonprofit news organization, obtained records of companies and trusts created by two offshore companies. These included information on at least 23 companies linked to an alleged $230 million tax fraud in Russia, a case that was being investigated by Sergei Magnitsky. The ICIJ investigation also revealed that the husband of one of the Russian tax officials deposited millions in a Swiss bank account set up by one of the offshore companies.

Over the past 20 years, Switzerland has returned about $2 billion of ill-gotten money in at least ten cases, including to Tunisia, Egypt, Brazil, Nigeria, Malaysia and Uzbekistan (2022). Swiss bank accounts were utilised by the perpetrators of the 1Malaysia Development Berhad corruption and money laundering scandal.

More recent studies show that Credit Suisse alone held assets worth $100 billion over several decades which were linked to corruption and bribery to drug and human trafficking for more than 30,000 clients. Apart from the 2022 "Suisse secrets" revelations, Credit Suisse had several other cases of scandals reported by the media over the last decades.

In 2018, London-based Tax Justice Network ranks Switzerland's banking sector as the "most corrupt" in the world due to a large offshore banking industry and very strict secrecy laws. The ranking attempts to measure how much assistance the country's legal systems provide to money laundering, and to protecting corruptly obtained wealth.

As of 2019, key criminal probes involving Swiss banks were the Petrobras bribery case, the Mozambique "tuna bonds", Credit Suisse "spygate" affair, Raiffeisen insider trading and UBS tax evasion in France.

In 2021, the Swiss Broadcasting Corporation reported that the Zürich police are investigating CHF 9 billion from Venezuela that has been received by 30 Swiss banks. A Swiss bank account was used to bribe a Venezuelan minister. Other major cases involving the Credit Suisse money laundering case for drug-traffickers in Bulgaria, Falcon Bank, 1MBD, Glencore, SICPA, SBM Offshore, PKB, J. Safra Sarasin, Cramer Bank and Lombard Odier Bank.

In 2021, Swiss firm Allied Finance Trust AG and five Swiss bankers were charged with tax fraud conspiracy in New York.

In 2021, UBS was criminally convicted by an appeals court in France for money laundering the proceeds of tax evasion by French citizens and fined €1.8 billion.

In 2023, Switzerland returned $138 million to Taiwan in connection with a corruption scandal relating to the sale of French frigates to Taiwan in 1991.

In 2026, UBS was charged by FinCEN for repeatedly laundering money through one of its US subsidiaries and fined $125 million.

In 2026, Pierre Mirabaud, the ex-head of the Swiss Bankers Association, was convicted of corruption, bribing public officials and money laundering and was given a two-year suspended sentence by the Swiss authorities.

According to World Bank estimates, $20million-$40 million (CHF19.2 million-CHF38.4 million) is embezzled by corrupt government officials in developing countries every year.

Scandals related to funds held by dictators in Switzerland (not an exhaustive list).
Dictator	Country	Year(s)
Rafael Leónidas Trujillo	Dominican Republic	1960s
Mohammad Reza Pahlavi	Iran	1979
Ferdinand Marcos	Philippines	1986
Jean-Claude Duvalier	Haiti	1980s
Moussa Traoré	Mali	1991
Raúl Salinas	Mexico	1995
Mobutu Sese Seko	Zaire	1997
Sani Abacha	Nigeria	1990s
Vladimiro Montesinos	Peru	2000
Nursultan Nazarbayev	Kazakhstan	2000
Hosni Mubarak	Egypt	2011
Laurent Gbagbo	Ivory Coast	2011
Gulnara Karimova	Uzbekistan	2012
Viktor Yanukovych	Ukraine	2014
Najib Razak	Malaysia	2015

=== Tax evasion ===
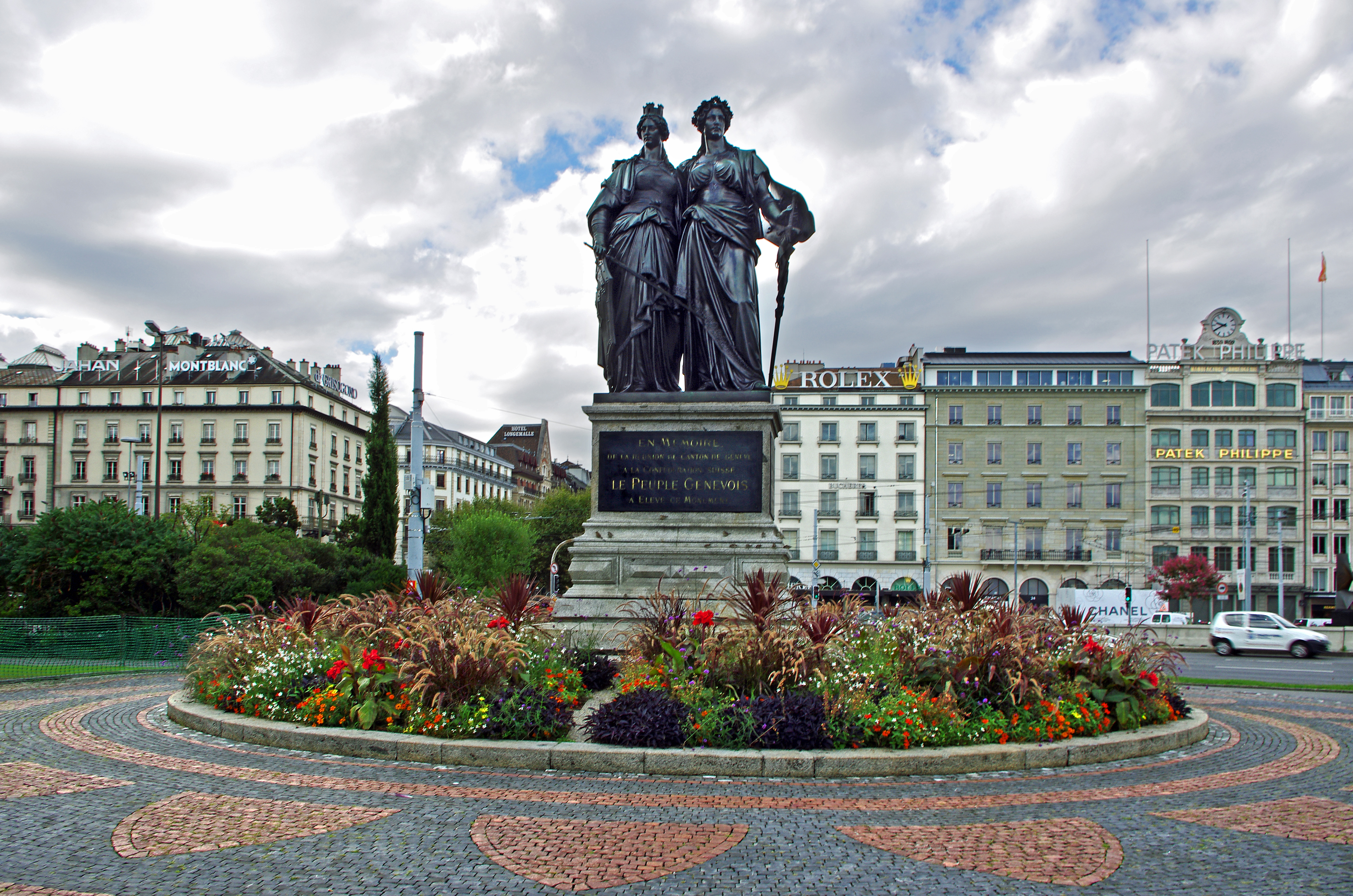
Citizens of Switzerland retain the country's strictest, most expansive, and unalienable banking secrecy protections as it pertains to taxation.

Switzerland has been ranked among the top three tax havens in the world every single year since the 2008 financial crisis, most recently in 2018. In 2021, U.S. President Joe Biden also called Switzerland a "tax haven" during his speech to a joint session of Congress. Money placed in tax havens, often/by definition, evades taxation and therefore diminishes tax revenues in the government's budget of the country of origin to whom it properly belongs, substantially, including for development purposes.

==== Background ====
According to the 2018 Financial Secrecy Index, Switzerland's banking secrecy laws have rendered it a premier tax haven since the 1900s. It also noted that this status has been frequently abused by criminals to illegally evade paying taxes in their home country. One of the most prominent attractions of the disclosure protection laws is the distinction between tax evasion (non-reporting of income) and tax fraud (active deception). Akin to the distinction between legal tax avoidance and illegal tax evasion in the U.S., the non-reporting of income is only a civil offense in Switzerland while tax fraud is a financial crime. When foreign clients deposit holdings into a Swiss bank account, the bank is legally prohibited from disclosing balances or client information to tax authorities. This prohibition can only be waived if the client has produced a written statement of consent or a financial crime has been directly linked to the bank account. More often than not, clients do not consent to foreign tax authorities, which leaves only the latter (financial crime) provision available. Many client services available in Switzerland (e.g. numbered bank accounts) are used to shield client data from tax authorities.

Many sovereign states do not legally require private bankers to confirm whether or not a client has paid their taxes, in any capacity. On top of this, Switzerland's banking secrecy laws prohibit the disclosure of client information under a variety of federal, cantonal, and civil policies. Many foreign nationals open Swiss bank accounts to take advantage of these laws and tax distinctions. While citizens of Switzerland retain the full force of banking secrecy protections, foreign clients are afforded some of the most stringent bank–client confidentiality protections in the world. In exchange for banking services, the Swiss government charges "a low, lump-sum option on the money they bank", after which Swiss tax authorities consider client tax burdens "settled". After the Banking Law of 1934 was passed, Swiss bankers traveled across Europe to advertise the country's banking secrecy during World War II. As European countries began to increase taxes to finance the war, wealthy clients moved their holdings into Swiss accounts to avoid taxation.

==== Fines ====
Swiss banks have collectively paid more than $12 billion in fines in recent years to the tax authorities in France, Germany, Italy, the United States and other countries for helping with tax evasion. Starting in 2022, fines on Swiss banks abroad will be tax deductible (unless crime is involved). In recent years, Swiss banks have also been fined by various international regulators billions of dollars for FOREX and LIBOR rates manipulations.

== In popular culture ==
Banking in Switzerland, in particular Swiss banking secrecy practices, has been detailed in global popular culture to varying degrees of accuracy. According to official statements from the Swiss National Film Archives, inaccurate or exaggerated portrayals negatively impact Switzerland by reducing bankers to unflattering "caricatures" that are "ever disposed to accept funds from questionable sources". In 2014, Sindy Schmiegel, a spokeswoman for the Swiss Bankers Association (SBA), stressed that financial regulation in Switzerland is dramatically more strict than portrayed fictionally. The Economic Times noted that popular culture portrays Swiss bank accounts as "completely anonymous", later adding "this is simply not true."

Swiss banking is prominently featured in the following films and television shows:

If you can't trust a Swiss banker, then what's the world come to?

— James Bond in The World Is Not Enough
- The Great Spy Chase (1964): Francis Lagneau (Lino Ventura) engages with a Swiss banker to open a bank account containing patents to powerful weapons. This film is considered the first motion picture to reference banking in Switzerland.
- Swiss banking has been mentioned by James Bond in film and in literature dozens of times, it plays a central role in:
  - Goldfinger (1964): James Bond (Sean Connery) thwarts Goldfinger's plans to rob a U.S. gold depository frequently citing Swiss underground gold bunkers and bank account numbers as motivation. This film was written after Switzerland's role in World War II was at the forefront of international critique on bank secrecy.
  - On Her Majesty's Secret Service (1969): supervillain Ernst Stavro Blofeld (Telly Savalas) tells James Bond (George Lazenby) that unless a large sum of money is deposited into a Swiss bank account, a bomb will detonate and kill thousands of people. Mentions of Swiss banking in the James Bond novels have been viewed as "reinforcing a stereotype".
  - The World Is Not Enough (1999): James Bond (Pierce Brosnan) visits a Swiss bank in Spain called La Banque Suisse de L'Industrie to meet an associate before jumping out of a five-story window.
  - Casino Royale (2006): After a high stakes poker game is completed, the winnings of James Bond (Daniel Craig) are transferred to a Swiss bank account in Basel for security.
- The Godfather Part III (1990): Frederick Keinszig (Helmut Berger), a Swiss banker for the Vatican, gets into a shootout with the Corleone family over technicalities over bank–client confidentiality. The movie was seen as establishing the "Swiss banker trope" within mainstream culture.
- The Bourne Identity (2002): Jason Bourne (Matt Damon), a secret operative for the Central Intelligence Agency (CIA) who has retrograde amnesia, begins to recall life events after opening a bank deposit box containing a gun, large amounts of international currency and a variety of passports. The scene was seen as unduly "[emphasizing] the issue of [bank] secrecy".
  Like most Swiss banks, our safe-deposit boxes are attached to a number, not a name. You have a key and a personal number known only to you.
  — Dan Brown, The Da Vinci Code
- The Da Vinci Code (2006): Robert Langdon (Tom Hanks) opens a Swiss bank account at the Paris-based "Depository Bank of Zürich", a high-tech bank that allows clients to deposit and withdraw assets with complete anonymity. The usage of this type of numbered bank account is illegal both in France and Switzerland.
- The Wolf of Wall Street (2013): Jordan Belfort (Leonardo DiCaprio) travels to the Geneva-based Union Bancaire Privée (UBP) to meet with private banker Jean Jacques Saurel (Jean Dujardin) who advises Belfort to open an account in the name of a relative with a European passport to avoid U.S. taxation. This is technically legal in Switzerland as Belfort was not charged with a financial crime (at the time of meeting) and extra banking secrecy is afforded to European citizens. Belfort's bank–client confidentiality was waived because Saurel traveled outside of Switzerland and was arrested on U.S. soil for a crime (money laundering) illegal in both countries. The fictional interaction was called "a bit ridiculous and exaggerated" and "not very Swiss" by the Swiss Bankers Association.

== See also ==
- List of Swiss financial market regulation
- List of banks in Switzerland
- Commodities trading in Switzerland

== Bibliography ==
- Guex, Sébastien (2000). "The Origins of the Swiss Banking Secrecy Law and Its Repercussions for Swiss Federal Policy" (PDF). Business History Review. 74 (2): 237–266. doi:10.2307/3116693. JSTOR 3116693. S2CID 154917222.
- Mueller, Kurt (1969). "The Swiss Banking Secret: From a Legal View". International and Comparative Law Quarterly. 18 (2): 360–377. doi:10.1093/iclqaj/18.2.360. JSTOR 757529.
- Groen, Ludo (2026). Mountains of Gold: Uncovering the Architecture of Swiss Banking. doi:10.54872/gta/5149.
