= Rudolf Elmer =

Swiss banker, whistleblower, and activist

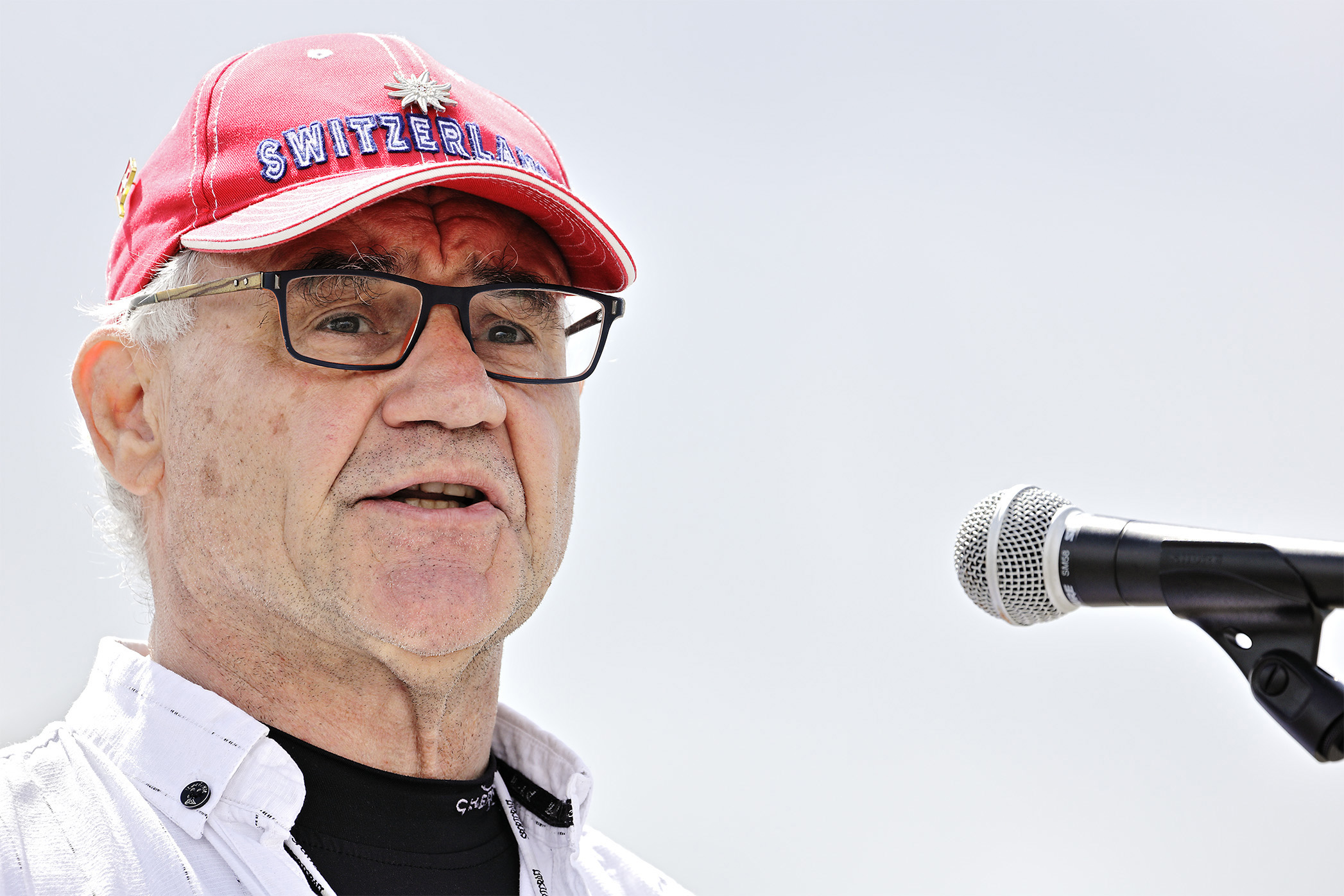
- Rudolf Elmer on 5 June 2021 in Geneva at the inauguration of the sculpture
- Born: 11 November 1955 (age 71); Zürich, Switzerland
- Occupations: Private banker; activist
- Employer(s): Julius Bär, 1980s–2002
- Known for: Disclosing confidential banking information to WikiLeaks in 2008 in violation of Swiss banking secrecy laws
- Criminal penalty: 2-year probation and 9,500 euro fine

Rudolf Elmer (born 1 November 1955) is a Swiss private banker, whistleblower, and activist. He worked as a banker at Julius Bär from the 1980s to his dismissal in 2002. At this time, he was head of the bank's Caribbean operations for eight years. In 2005 he was arrested by Zürich authorities and held for 30 days as Swiss authorities alleged he unsuccessfully attempted to disclose client information.

In 2008, Elmer allegedly disclosed confidential bank documents to WikiLeaks detailing the activities of Julius Bär in the Cayman Islands and its role in alleged tax evasion. In January 2011, he was convicted in Switzerland of breaching the country's secrecy laws. He was rearrested immediately thereafter for having again distributed illegally obtained data to WikiLeaks. Julius Bär as well as select Swiss and German newspapers alleges that Elmer has doctored evidence to suggest the bank engaged in tax evasion.

== Julius Bär ==
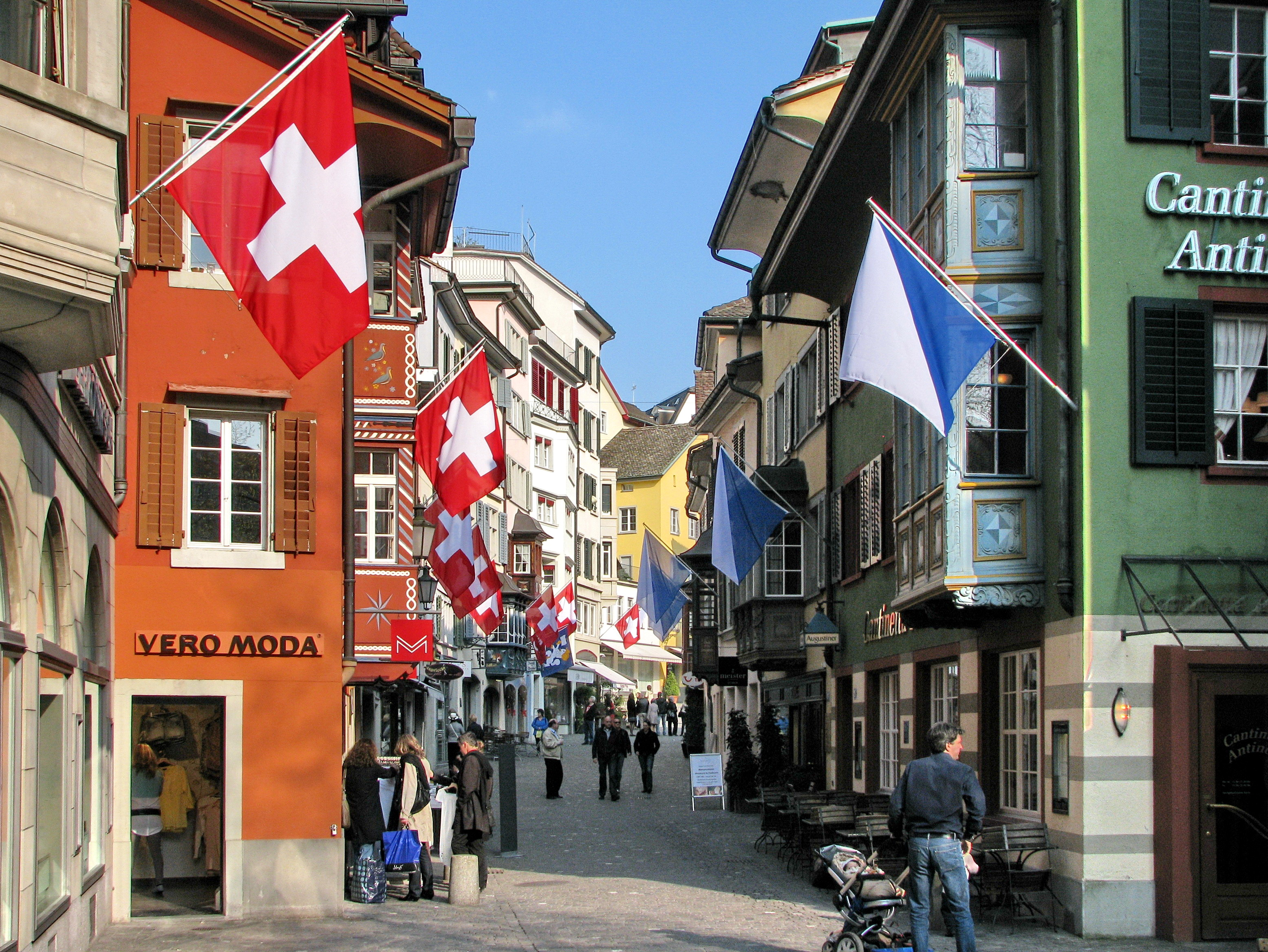
Elmer worked in Julius Bär's Zürich offices until he was fired for stealing documents in 2002.

Elmer was hired by Swiss bank Julius Bär during the early 1980s as a private banker in their Zürich offices. He worked at the bank as a private banker throughout the 1980s and 1990s before leading the bank's Caribbean operations from 1994 to 2002. In late 2001, Julius Bär internal security discovered that internal data had been stolen and required that every employee take a lie detector test for involvement. Elmer did not take the test the first time around due to his health and then later failed. He was then released from employment on these grounds, although he was still in possession of backup copies of data. According to the bank it was "data theft committed with criminal intent". After his resignation, he sent documents to various media, whereupon the bank called for an investigation of him and his family. In 2005, Elmer sold a Swiss business newspaper a CD with 169 megabytes of customer data, but was arrested shortly afterwards in Zurich on suspicion of violating Swiss banking secrecy law. He sat 30 days in custody. Soon after his parole he started a website for whistleblowers.

On 3 March 2008 the German magazine Der Spiegel revealed that Elmer was the source of documents that appeared some weeks earlier on WikiLeaks; Der Spiegel referred to them as partly authentic and partly fake. A California judge had the service provider of WikiLeaks block the site's domain (wikileaks.org) on behalf of Julius Bär on 18 February 2008. According Swiss television documentary show Rundschau, Elmer accused his bank of evading taxes by declaring bank work to have been carried out in the Cayman Islands, whereas the work was actually done in Switzerland. In 2008, Elmer released internal bank documents with customer data and other sensitive details to the Wikileaks website. According to these allegations, Julius Bär held their customers funds by funneling through investment frameworks of offshore accounts to increase profits for themselves and circumvent the Swiss tax authorities. Julius Bär denied this in a statement saying that all of its activities in the Cayman Islands were legal and did not violate of Swiss banking regulations. On 17 January 2011, Elmer met with Julian Assange of WikiLeaks at a press conference at London's Frontline Club to hand over two disks in public view of reporters. The records included information on 2000 account holders and came from three financial institutions, including Julius Bär. Assange said the data would be reviewed and published in full. A month later, Elmer stated in court that the disks were empty and thus contained no bank customer data.

=== First trial ===
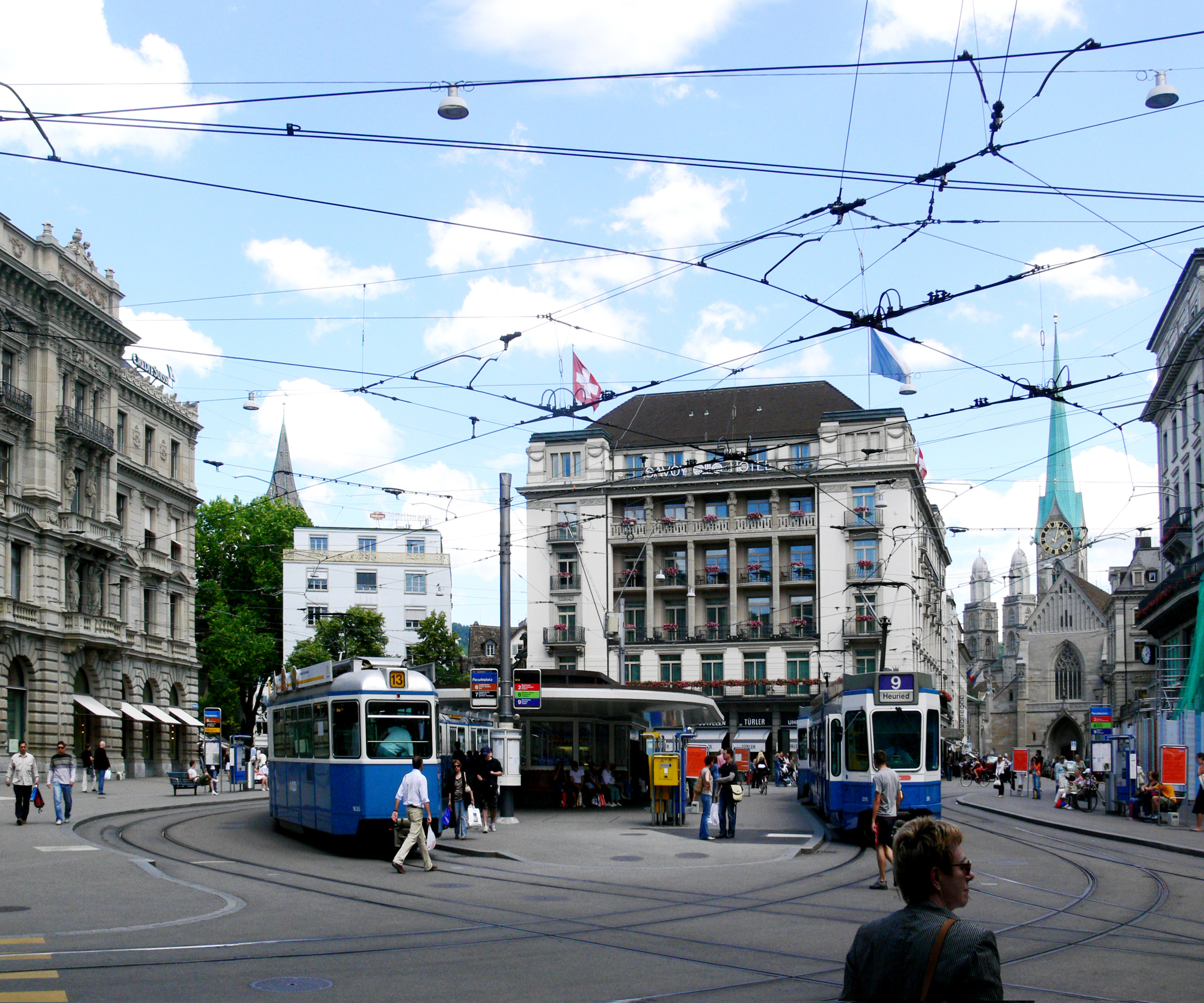
Elmer faced his first trial at the Zurich District Court.

On 19 January 2011, Elmer was ordered to answer before the Zurich District Court for breach of banking and business secrecy laws as well as a charge of coercion. Elmer was accused several times by bank employees to have harmed "by violence and the threat of serious consequences" and supposedly a bomb threat against the main building of the bank. In addition, he was tried for 2004 accusations of attempting to blackmail the bank of US$50,000, which did not respond to his offer. The publications on WikiLeaks were not part of the prosecution. The prosecutor demanded a prison term of eight months without parole and a fine of 2,000 Swiss francs. Elmer was sentenced to probation for a period of two years and fined about 5,600 euros on multiple counts of attempted coercion, threats and breaching of banking secrecy. He also was ordered to pay three-quarters of the court fees in the amount of 5,000 francs (about 3,900 euros). The presiding judge believed that Elmer had not become a whistleblower for ethical reasons, but for personal revenge: "You were for many years part of the banking world and have benefited from it." On the same day of his conviction Elmer was arrested on renewed suspicion of violation of Swiss banking secrecy. Elmer had two days earlier handed over two disks with data of suspected bank customers to Julian Assange of WikiLeaks for publication as well as remanded data collection, which was published on WikiLeaks. On 22 January 2011, Elmer was brought into custody on the grounds of urgent suspicion and risk of collusion. Elmer appealed to the Supreme Court of the Canton of Zurich against the detention order. Elmer was summoned on 16 February 2011 before the court and testified that the disks were empty and thus contained no bank customer data. The court found Elmer's presentation as "totally unbelievable" and rejected the appeal due to the danger of collusion. In July 2011, the remanding was extended until October 2011. On 25 July 2011, Elmer was released from custody. After he left court he was re-arrested in connection with handing data to WikiLeaks only two days earlier, a move that was described by the prosecutor of the first case as contempt of court. On 25 July 2011, Elmer was set free.

=== Second trial ===
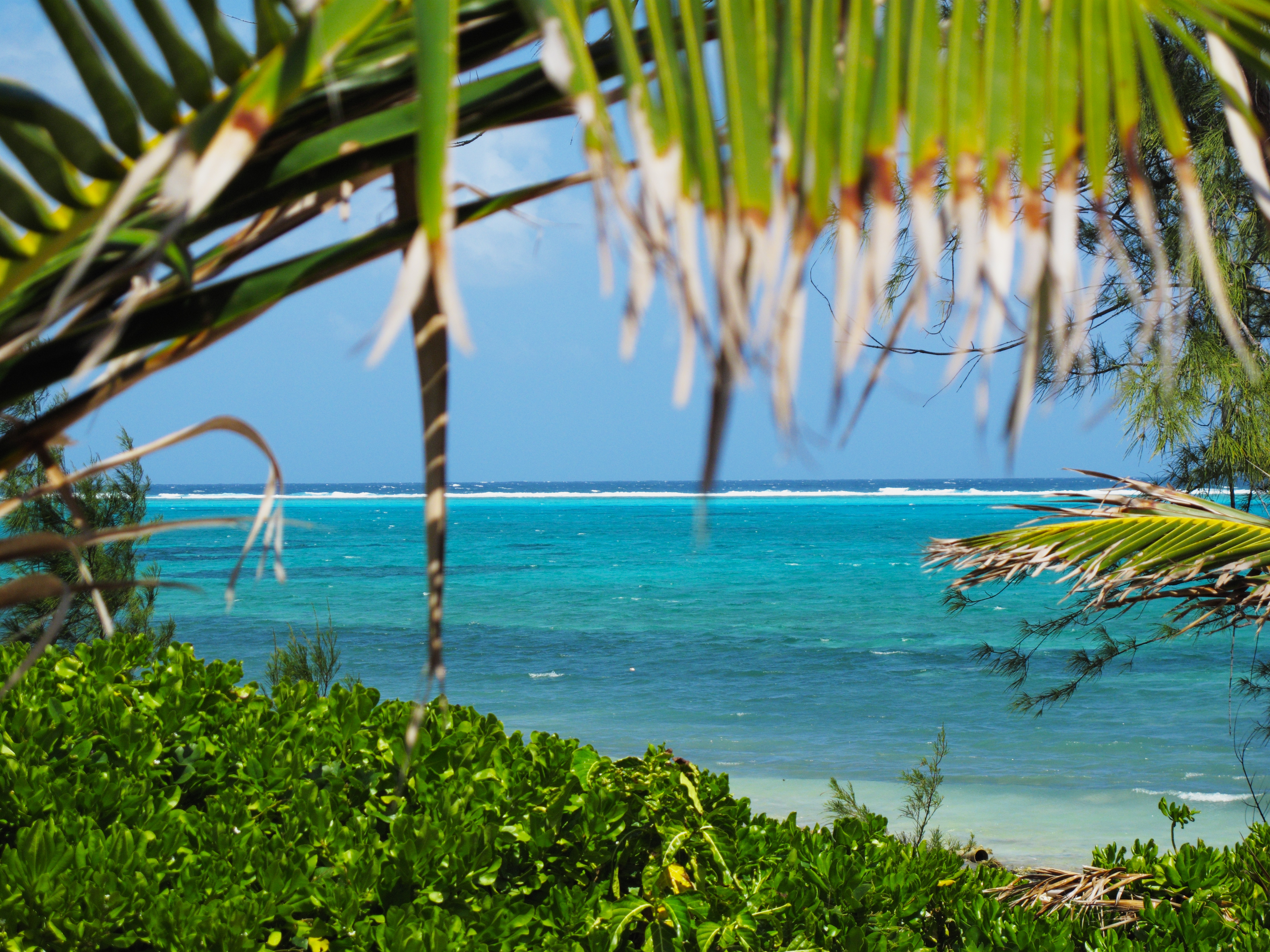
Elmer alleged that Julius Bär noted activities done in Switzerland as if they were done in the Cayman Islands.

On 17 November 2011, an appeal hearing was held at the Supreme Court of the Canton of Zurich. The Court made no judgment and sent the indictment back to the prosecutor and that it must review the investigation and supplement if necessary. As justification, the court stated that besides Elmer and the Bank, no one knew if this data actually existed in reality on the disks. It was difficult to decipher what data was actually on the disks. The judgment depends on whether the data from Swiss customers are from Switzerland, or those of the Cayman Islands, where the Swiss banking secrecy rights could not be applied. Thus, the bank was asked to explain the exact content of the CDs, which it had not done before. If Elmer is correct and dealing with "Cayman - data" he would be acquitted of charges of bank secrecy violation. Banking secrecy in the Cayman Islands is potentially punishable, although not per se in Switzerland.

Furthermore, the court found that there was insufficient evidence that Elmer authored a "significant threat" against a legal services employee of the bank. In an e-mail from Mauritius, the sender threatened the employee, and claimed he was a killer and recognized him. It was not enough that Elmer had then lived and worked in Mauritius. It must be clarified where the email was sent directly from and who sent it. It is up to the prosecutor to obtain the necessary evidence. Elmer began a protest display outside the bank. While outside the bank he was routinely under surveillance by private detectives. It is alleged that the bank offered Elmer a monetary incentive to end his display. In May 2012, the Zurich High Court ruled in an interim decision that three CDs that Elmer is said to have sent to the tax authorities or the business newspaper "Cash" may be unsealed and evaluated by the prosecution. The bank renounced the possibility of lodging an appeal against this decision.

=== Supreme Court of Switzerland ===
The criminal chamber of the Federal Court on 10 October 2018 - after a public hearing before judges (lasting 150 minutes - without the parties present) - by 3 votes to 2 gave a groundbreaking judgment of acquittal in the case of Rudolf Elmer regarding violation of bank secrecy, and other matters. Most importantly, the charge of violation of Swiss bank secrecy alleged against the well-known whistleblower Elmer brought by the Higher Prosecution Office of the canton of Zurich was rejected by the Federal court and the acquittal of Rudolf Elmer by the High Court of the Canton of Zurich was confirmed. The Federal Court also upheld the complaint by Rudolf Elmer concerning the imposition of an advance payment for the release of confiscated data and documents as well as the modalities for the return of the personal data of the Elmer family. His complaint against the imposition of three-quarters of the costs of the case, including the investigation costs, in the amount of CHF 320,000, and against the penalty for convictions for document forgery and threatening behaviour, were rejected by the Federal court.

== Impact ==
The Swiss newspaper Der Sonntag wrote in a December 2010 article that Elmer had confessed to threatening to kill several bank employees. Elmer said: "I have certainly made mistakes. My emotions have been out of control." The newspaper also alleged that Elmer had forged several documents, which would damage his credibility as a whistleblower. Also, the bank alleged that erroneous data about customers was given to WikiLeaks. WikiLeaks had to apologize in at least one case to an individual involved. On his computer a letter to the right-wing party NPD in Germany was found, in which Elmer offered the party certain documents. Elmer reported the letter was never sent.

Constantin Seibt wrote in the Tages-Anzeiger: "Rudolf Elmer is the model case of a whistleblower. He is no angel. Almost all whistleblowers are complex cases. They betray their companies not only from a sense of justice, but also for other reasons, such as wounded pride and grievances. And get caught up in it. The more that the case involves their lives, the more destructive is their struggle: dismissal, years of court cases, divorces, financial ruin - the impact of whistleblowing has similar consequences to a serious crime than a good deed".

In July 2012, the Swiss Press Council received a complaint from Elmer on the weekly magazine World Week (WW). Journalist Alex Baur dubbed Elmer as a "thief" and "blackmailer" and sought to confront him.

== See also ==
- Offshore: Elmer and Swiss Bank Secrecy directed by Werner Schweizer, Dschointventure, Zurich
- Banking in Switzerland
- Hervé Falciani, a French-Italian whistleblower for HSBC operations in Switzerland
- Panama Papers, a 2015 leak
- Paradise Papers, a 2017 leak

== Bibliography ==
- Bankenterror: Die Schweiz und die Cayman Islands als Handlanger des weltweiten Finanzterrorismus. Books on Demand, Norderstedt 2010, ISBN 978-3-8391-4171-7. Vorschau at Google Books
- Elmer schert aus, Carlos Hanimann, Echtzeitverlag 2016, ISBN 9783905800432
- Stalking auf dem Schweizer Finanzplatz, Rudolf Elmer, Smashwords 2021, ISBN 9780463049662
- Faust Kalam (Pseudonym, Rudolf Elmer: Tax Heavens. The Demonization of a Swiss Whistleblower. Books on Demand: Lulu.com 2010, ISBN 978-0-557-75219-5.
