= Numbered bank account =

Type of bank account

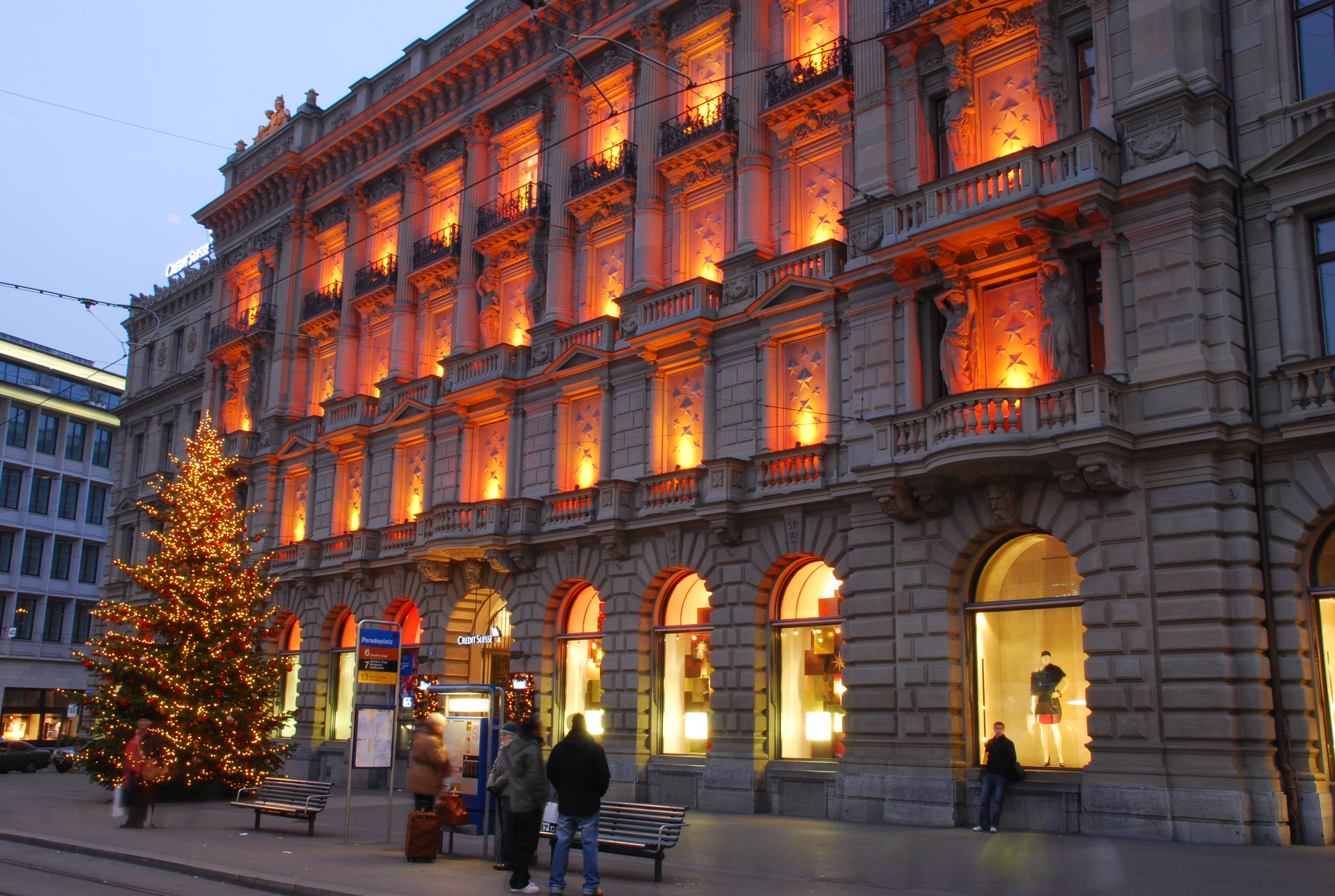
Many banks in Switzerland and other off-shore financial centers, offer the usage of numbered bank accounts for an extra degree of banking secrecy.

Numbered bank accounts are bank accounts wherein the identity of the holder is replaced with a multi-digit number known only to the client and selected private bankers. Although these accounts do add another layer of banking secrecy, they are not completely anonymous as the name of the client is still recorded by the bank and is subject to limited, warranted disclosure.

During the 1910s, bankers from Switzerland created numbered bank accounts to add a layer of anonymity for European clients seeking to avoid paying World War I taxes. With the passage of the Swiss Banking Law of 1934, this practice proliferated across the banking industry in Switzerland. Some Swiss banks supplement the number with a code name such as "Cardinal", "Octopussy" or "Cello" as an alternative manner to identify the client. However, to open this type of account in Switzerland, clients must pass a multi-stage clearance procedure and prove to the bank the lawful origins of their assets. Banking institutions that have adopted this practice in Europe, Asia, and the Americas also require clients to undergo stringent vetting and provide the identity of the beneficial owner. The usage of fake names to open these accounts is prohibited in Switzerland, the European Union, the United States, and other off-shore financial centers.

Many sovereign state governments have outlawed the usage of these accounts as they are commonly associated with a desire by the account holder to either minimize governmental scrutiny or avoid taxation. Most regulations governing the usage of numbered bank accounts require that the holder sign a document and undergoes a background check that confirms who they are and a connection to the account. Despite the regulations, numbered bank accounts by their very nature are more private than normal bank accounts. In Switzerland, for example, bankers are outlawed from disclosing whether or not an account is numbered to any governmental agency unless proof of deliberate fraud is established, not merely the non-reporting of assets in order to avoid taxation.

== See also ==
- Banking in Switzerland
