= Mass media in Switzerland =

Driven by its four national languages, cultural diversity and economic status, Switzerland developed distinct mass media sectors in Europe.

Still, due to its small territorial size, it is strongly influenced by the media of larger bordering countries, with foreign journals, radios and televisions popular throughout the country. The broadcasting sector is dominated by the SRG SSR, subsidized by the federal government, while the printed press is free of governmental involvement.

Switzerland was ranked tenth in 2021 in the annual "Worldwide press freedom ranking of countries" published by Reporters Without Borders.

== Internet ==
- Swissinfo (swissinfo.ch) is a ten-language news and information platform produced by the Swiss Broadcasting Corporation.
- SWITCH Information Technology Services
- Swiss Internet Exchange

== Controversies ==
=== Freedom of press ===
Since leaking financial data is a criminal offense in Switzerland (even if it is in the public interest) punishable with up to five years in jail, Swiss media argued in February 2022 that the banking secrecy law runs contrary to freedom of speech and freedom of the press in some cases. In 2022, the United Nations Human Rights Council asked for better protection of journalists and whistleblowers in this regard.

== Bibliography ==
- Euromedia Research Group; Mary Kelly; et al., eds. (2004). "Switzerland". Media in Europe (3rd ed.). SAGE Publications. ISBN 978-0-7619-4132-3.
