= International and Comparative Law Quarterly =

International & Comparative Law Quarterly
- Discipline: International law, comparative law
- Language: English

Publication details
- History: 1952–present
- Publisher: Cambridge University Press
- Frequency: Quarterly

Standard abbreviations
- Bluebook: Int'l & Comp. L.Q.
- ISO 4: Int. Comp. Law Q.

Indexing
- ISSN: 0020-5893 (print); 1471-6895 (web)
- JSTOR: intecomplawquar

Links
- Journal homepage

The International & Comparative Law Quarterly is a law review published quarterly by the British Institute of International and Comparative Law. It was established in 1952 and covers comparative law as well as public and private international law, including human rights, war crimes, and genocide, World Trade Organization law and investment treaty arbitration, recent developments of international courts and tribunals, as well as comparative public and private law all over the world. In addition to longer articles, the journal publishes book reviews. The editor-in-chief is Alex Mills (University College London) and the Managing Editor is Anna Riddell-Roberts (British Institute of International and Comparative Law).

This journal is the result of the merger of the Journal of Comparative Legislation and International Law and The International Law Quarterly.
