= Municipal offense =

Infringement of a city ordinance

In Wisconsin, a municipal offense or ordinance offense or civil offense or noncriminal offense or municipal infraction or infraction is the infringement of a city ordinance.

A municipal offense is not a crime.

As of 1989, the Montana Code provided that:

7-1-4150. Municipal infractions — civil offense. (1) A municipal infraction is a civil offense punishable by a civil penalty of not more than $300 for each violation or if the infraction is a repeat offense, a civil penalty not to exceed $500 for each repeat violation.
(2) A municipality may by ordinance provide that a violation of an ordinance is a municipal infraction.
(3) (a) A municipality may by ordinance provide that a criminal offense under state law that is punishable only by a fine is a municipal infraction.
(b) Statutory surcharges must be imposed, as provided in 3-1-317(1)(a), 3-1-318(1), and 46-18-236(6)(a), on municipal infractions that are criminal offenses under state law, and the amounts must be distributed as provided in those sections.
(c) A person may not be proceeded against for the same act or omission to act under both a municipal infraction ordinance and the corresponding state law criminal offense on which the municipal infraction ordinance is based.
(4) An officer who is authorized by a municipality to enforce a municipal code or regulation may issue a civil citation to a person who commits a municipal infraction. The citation may be served by personal service, by certified mail addressed to the defendant at the defendant's last-known mailing address, return receipt requested, or by publication, as provided in Rule 4D(5). M. R. Civ. P. A copy of the citation must be retained by the issuing officer and one copy must be sent to the clerk of the municipal or city court. The citation must serve as notification that a municipal infraction has been committed and must contain the following information:

(a) the name and address of the defendant;
(b) the name or description of the infraction attested to by the officer issuing the citation;
(c) the location and time of the infraction;
(d) the amount of civil penalty to be assessed or the alternate relief sought, or both; ::(e) the manner, location, and time in which the penalty may be paid;
(f) the time and place of court appearance; and
(g) the penalty for failure to appear in court.

See also the Iowa Code Annotated, West Pub Co, 1994, vol 17, p 75.
