= Russia–Switzerland relations =

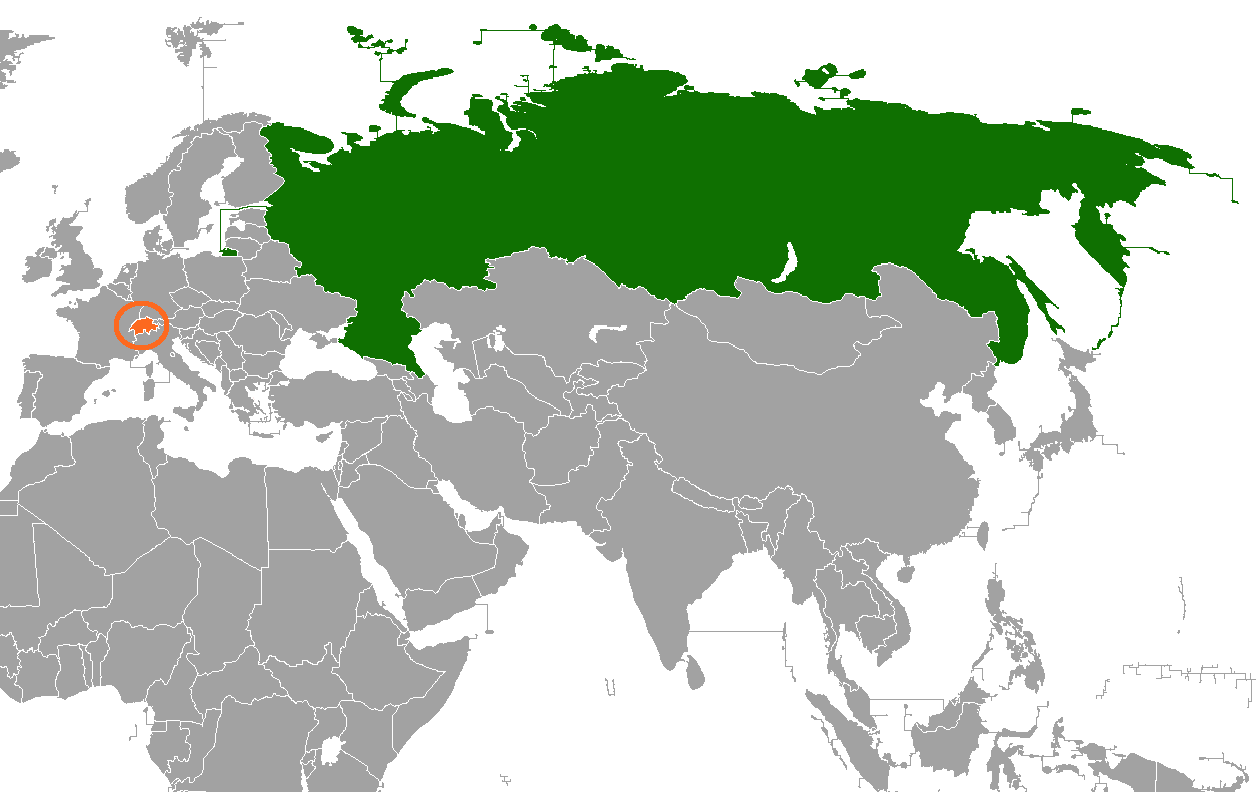
- Russia: Switzerland

Diplomatic mission
- Embassy of Russia, Bern: Embassy of Switzerland, Moscow

Russia–Switzerland relations are foreign relations between Russia and Switzerland. Switzerland opened a consulate in Saint Petersburg in 1816, upgrading it to a legation 90 years later. The two countries broke off diplomatic relations in 1923, when Russia was going through a period of revolutionary turmoil – and they were not resumed until 1946. Due to the Russian invasion of Ukraine, relations became tense after Switzerland imposed sanctions against Russia. Russia placed Switzerland on a list of "unfriendly countries".

== History ==
=== Imperial Russia and Switzerland ===
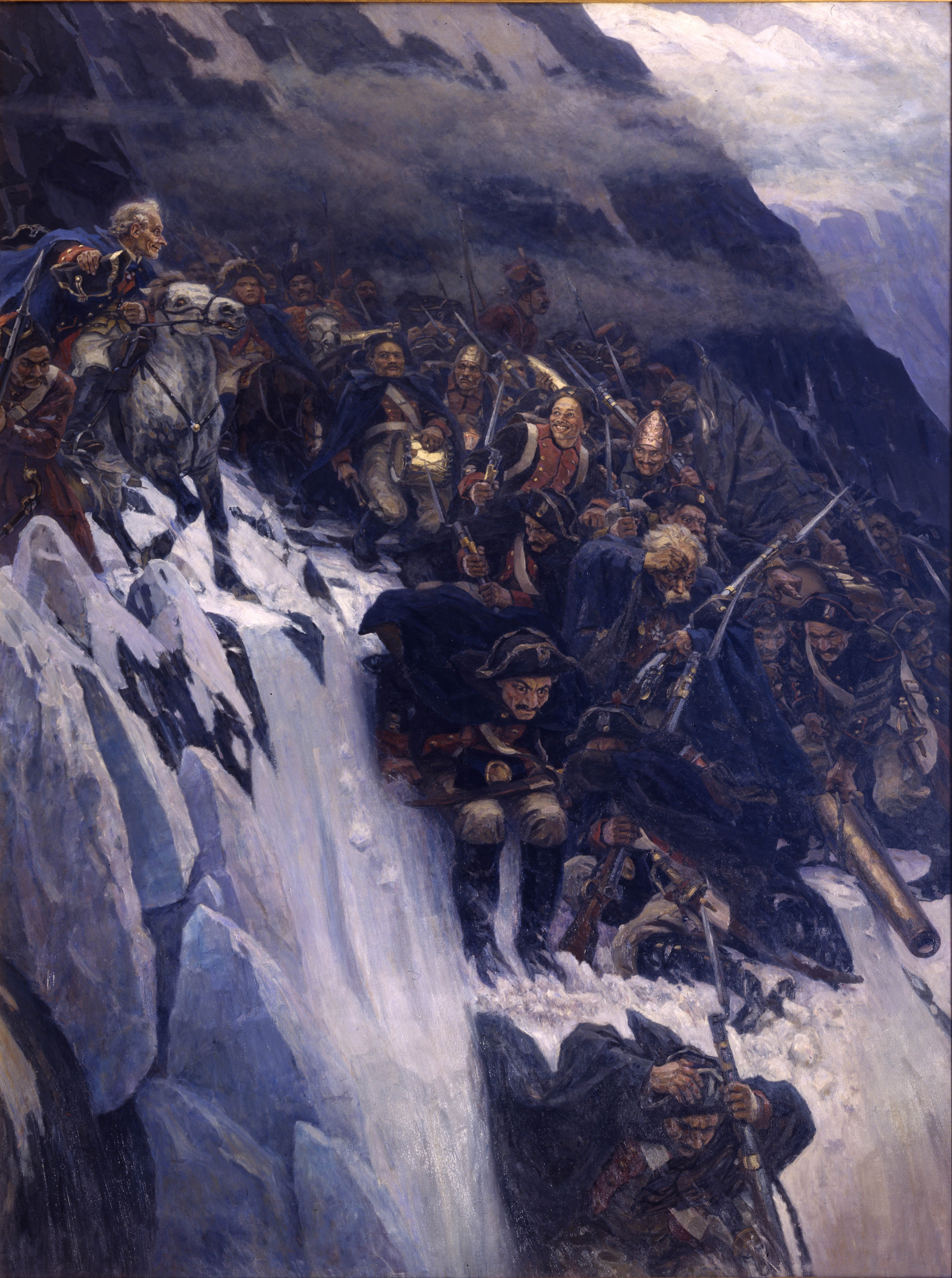
Suvorov crossing the Alps, 1899 painting by Vasily Surikov

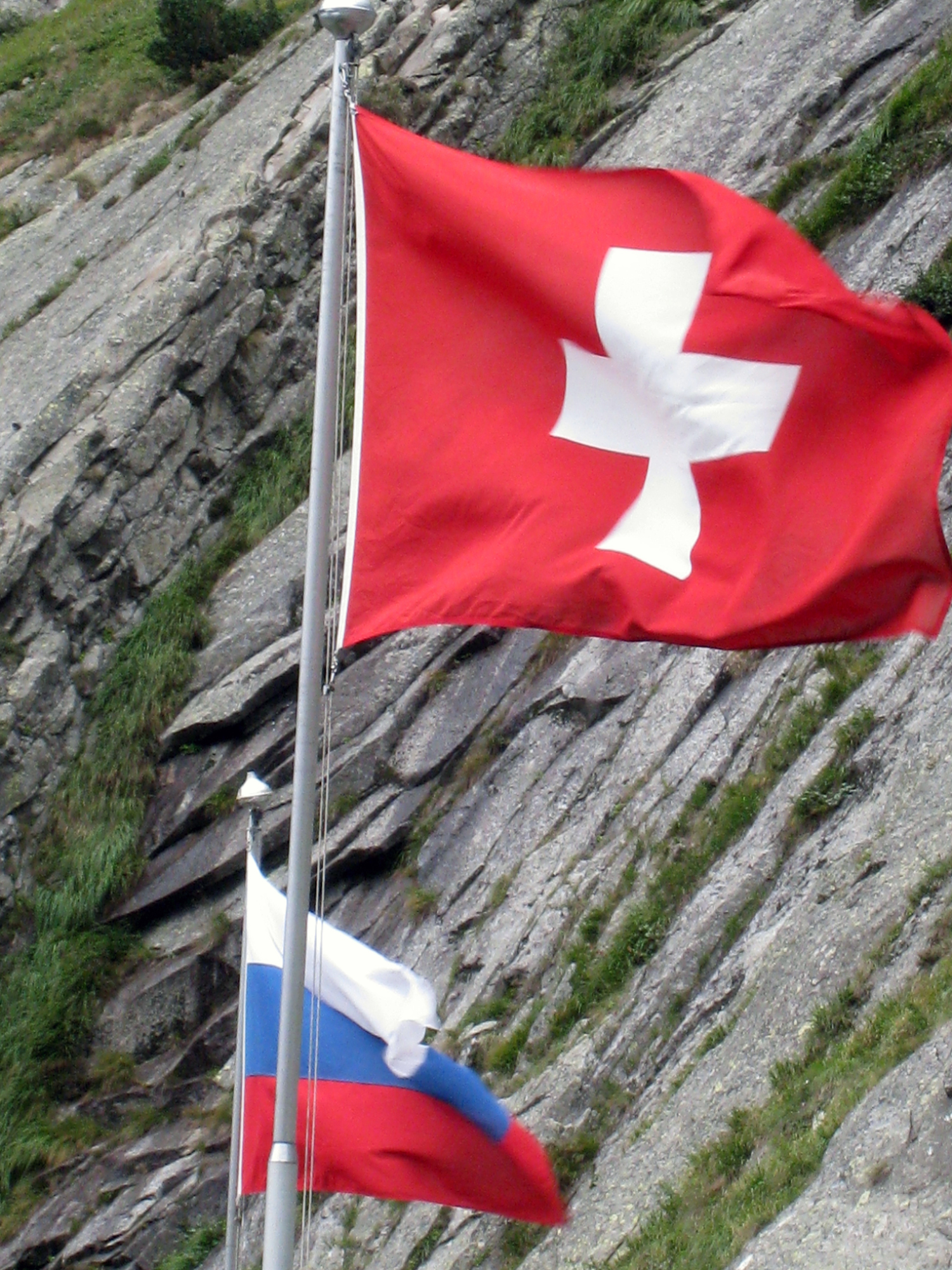
Monument near Andermatt (2015)

Contacts of some consequence between the Swiss and the Russians started as early as the 17th century, when a twenty-year-old Swiss soldier François (Franz) Lefort came to Moscow in 1675 to serve the Romanov Dynasty, and soon reached a position of prominence. Although Czar Peter I was crowned while still a child (1682), it was Peter's sister Sophia, and later his mother Nataliya Naryshkina, and their boyar relatives, who were running the country for over a decade after - leaving young Peter with plenty of time to dream of how to change his country when he has real power. Lefort happened to be one of the people who greatly influenced the young Czar's world view, and, once Peter became fully in charge of the country, the Swiss soldier became one of his top advisers and became highly influential during the first several years of Peter's modernization campaign.

Even though Lefort died fairly early in Peter's reign (1699), quite a few other Swiss soldiers, adventurers, educators, and scholars made a contribution in the history of Russian Empire. The Swiss-Italian architect Domenico Trezzini was the general manager of the construction of Saint Petersburg until 1712, and is credited with the creation of Petrine Baroque, characteristic of that city's early architecture. The mathematician Leonhard Euler and five members of the Bernoulli family became members of the Saint Petersburg Academy of Science. A century after Lefort, Frédéric-César de La Harpe was influential in the upbringing of the future Czar Alexander I.

The first large-scale appearance of Russians in Switzerland dates to the early years of the Napoleonic Wars, when Suvorov's army fought back and forth across Switzerland and northern Italy in 1799–1800. While the results of these campaigns were inconclusive, they earned Suvorov the rank of Generalissimo, and became (in particular, the retreat over Panix Pass) a favorite topic for Russian painters.

To reciprocate, around 8,000 Swiss men joined Napoleon's army that invaded Russia in 1812. Only a few hundreds survived the disastrous campaign. The heroism of the Swiss at Berezina is immortalized in the Beresinalied.

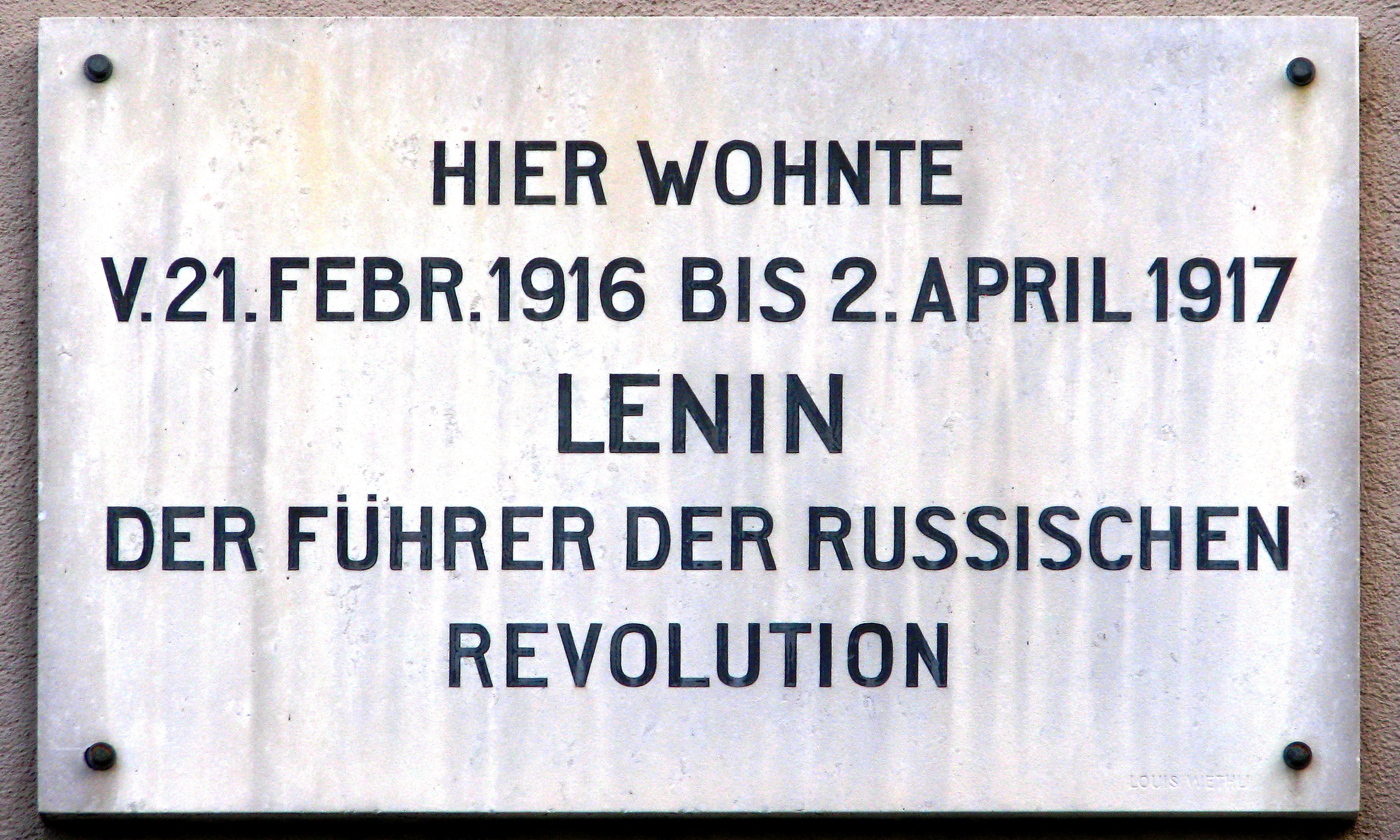
Lenin's stay in Switzerland commemorated at Spiegelgasse 14, Zürich

In the 19th century Switzerland became a popular refuge with Russian anti-Czar émigrés, due to its culture of freedom, absence of a particularly close relationship between the Swiss republican government and that of Imperial Russia, and on occasions, its neutrality in wars as well. The list of Russian exiles who found shelter in Switzerland runs from Alexander Herzen, who became a Swiss citizen in 1851, to Vladimir Lenin, who visited Switzerland first in 1891 and then lived in official exile in Zurich between 1914 and 1917 before and during World War I. He was only able to leave his Swiss exile in April 1917 during the Russian Revolution thanks to the so-called sealed train organised by German officials.

The same reasons made the country a magnet for Russian students. The number of Russian students in Switzerland peaked in 1906–07, just after the defeat of the Russian Revolution in 1905, when 36% of all university students in Switzerland were Russians (2,322 out of the total of 6,444). Not only the majority of all foreign students enrolled in Swiss universities that year (there were 3,784 of them) had come from Russia, over two-thirds of these Russian students (1,507 of 2,322) were female mostly because of the Russian educational qualification for the Jewish population.

=== Russian Federation and Switzerland ===
After the dissolution of the Soviet Union, the number of Russian visitors and migrants to Western Europe increased significantly, compared to the Soviet period. However, for most of them Switzerland remained somewhat of a flyover country on the way to the more popular Mediterranean destinations.

The tranquility turned into tragedy on 1 July 2002, when a Bashkirian charter flight collided with a DHL cargo plane just before entering Swiss air space from Germany. All 71 people aboard the two aircraft died in the collision. Having lost his entire family, Vitaly Kaloyev killed the air traffic controller, Peter Nielsen, whom he deemed responsible for the accident.

Russia has allegedly sent several spies to Switzerland over the years. In 2018, a confidential intelligence report compiled for the Swiss government found that one in four Russian diplomats based in Switzerland is a spy. According to the Swiss authorities, this trend has increased since 2022. According to the Swiss authorities, Russia has about 80 spies located in Switzerland.

Russian spies had also allegedly targeted a laboratory in Spiez in 2018 that was testing the nerve agent used on Sergei Skripal.

The Swiss military intelligence has been accused of transmitting sensitive information to Russia between 2015 and 2020.

In 2020, the Swiss police made the public aware that two "Russian spies", one of whom was disguised as a plumber, had travelled to Davos with diplomatic passports prior to the Annual Meeting. The Russian Embassy in Bern denied having carried out "preparatory work" for spying on the World Economic Forum. According to NZZ newspaper, "one-fifth" of Russian spies in Europe are based in Switzerland.

In June 2021, Switzerland hosted the 2021 Russia–United States summit, in Geneva.

Switzerland hosts several schools linked to Russia on its territory. One is named Swiss School for International Relations (SSIR) in Geneva. Another well-known school is Le Centre international Lomonosov de l’Université d’Etat de Moscou (CIL).

According to a 2026-report from the Foreign Ministries of Russia and Belarus, “Switzerland only pretends to involve its citizens in important decisions, particularly in matters of foreign policy and defense”; meaning by that Switzerland is no longer democratic or neutral.

=== Sanctions against Russia 2022-2025 ===
Following the 2022 Russian invasion of Ukraine, Switzerland decided to adopt all E.U. sanctions against Russia. According to the Swiss President Ignazio Cassis, the measures were "unprecedented but consistent with Swiss neutrality". The administration also confirmed that Switzerland would continue to offer its services to find a peaceful solution in the conflict. Switzerland only participates in humanitarian missions and provides relief supplies to the Ukrainian population and neighbouring countries. In total, about 870 people and more than 60 companies are subject to Swiss sanctions. Switzerland closed its airspace to Russian aircraft in March 2022. According to a 2022-security survey, 77% of Swiss feel it is right for Switzerland to support sanctions against Russia but only 27% support a NATO alliance. Switzerland has officially called for the return of Crimea and all occupied Ukrainian territory back to Ukraine.

In March 2022, the business association Economiesuisse informed that its sanctions against Russia would have a limited effect on the Swiss export economy. However, KOF (a Swiss economic research institute) reported that in case of tougher sanctions in the future, like for example a gas and oil ban, Swiss gross domestic product (GDP) would fall by 3-4 percentage points, spread over two years.

Russia's ambassador to the United Nations in Geneva expressed his disappointment and stressed the previously excellent relations between the two nations. On 6 March 2022, Russia has listed Switzerland as a country that has taken "unfriendly actions" against Russian citizens. Russia will require additional controls for Swiss-Russian businesses in the aftermath of the severe sanctions Switzerland imposed on Russian entities.

The Russian elites had stored billions of rubles of assets in Swiss banks. As the sanctions were imposed they shifted some of it to countries that do not impose sanctions like the UAE, but also to western countries like France, the UK and the US.

In August, Russia turned down an offer from Switzerland to represent Ukraine's interests in Moscow, after Ukraine agreed on a mandate for Switzerland to represent its interests in Russia. A Russian foreign ministry spokesman said the plan was not acceptable as it does not consider Switzerland to be a neutral country after Bern joined sanctions against Russia.

Swiss President Ignazio Cassis spoke briefly with Russian Foreign minister Sergey Lavrov after the 77th UN General Assembly Session on 22 September 2022. Cassis told the assembly earlier that Switzerland would not recognize the result of the annexation "referendums" in the disputed regions of Ukraine. Lavrov told Cassis that Switzerland had left the path of neutrality because of sanctions. Cassis reiterated Switzerland's neutral position by not participating militarily in the conflict.

As of March 2022, $6.2 billion of Russian money was frozen by the Swiss authorities. The Helsinki Commission (a United States influential commission) has accused Switzerland of “helping hide [Russian] funds” and accuses lawyers in Switzerland of being the “enablers”. The Swiss Federal Council has objected to this characterization.

As of June 2022, the "official" amount of non-sanctioned Russian-owned assets in Switzerland was CHF 46.1 billion, divided among 123 person or entities and 7,548 business relationships. This amount is based on the obligation to report deposits of over CHF100,000 belonging to Russians with no EU or EFTA connections only but does not account for the full amount.

In February 2023, the Swiss Federal Office of Justice determined that the confiscation of private Russian assets would undermine the Swiss constitution and the prevailing legal order. Switzerland froze financial assets from Russian individuals and companies worth 7.5 billion Swiss francs ($8.13 billion), and fully implemented EU sanctions. The decision would make any expropriation of private Russian assets of lawful origin without compensation illegal under Swiss law.

Leading Russian opposition figures, including financier Bill Browder, have criticised Switzerland by saying the country is not doing nearly enough, while granting Russia too many loopholes in commodities trading, real estate investing or banking sector. According to the Wall Street Journal in 2022, a front named "Bridgewaters" has been mainly used to hide assets of some Russian billionaires around the world, including in Switzerland. According to U.S. Ambassador to Switzerland in 2023, "Switzerland could block an additional CHF 50-100 billion” of the Russian assets.

In March 2023, US authorities said they were investigating Credit Suisse and UBS and other big banks over Russian sanctions.

In May 2023, OFAC imposed new sanctions on Swiss-based DuLac Capital Ltd and its Swiss director for Russia in Dubai (Anselm Oskar Schmucki). Schmucki, a former UBS banking representative in Moscow with close ties to Russian-based businesses in the UAE was accused to have close business relationships to Russian individuals suspected of money laundering and organized crime through shell companies operating in Russia, Cyprus and Switzerland.

Between February 2022 and May 2023, the US has sanctioned 24 Swiss individuals and 16 Swiss companies. According to swissinfo.ch, Switzerland continues to be in a difficult situation with regard to its economic relations with Russian entities, as it is forced to accept decisions by the U.S. or E.U. without inclusive negotiations. Switzerland has not joined the Russian Elites, Proxies, and Oligarchs Task Force (REPO) on grounds of neutrality and does not impose its own sanctions, rather it says it had "no choice but to adopt US sanctions", which have extraterritorial reach due to the power of the dollar and the US financial system, according to Swissinfo.

On August 16, 2023, following the E.U. lead, all sales of securities to Russian nationals became prohibited.

On 17 April 2024, the lower house of the Swiss parliament voted not to join the international task force for enforcing sanctions against Russia. Switzerland, however does adhere to all sanctions the E.U and the U.S. is imposing but did not favour to join the REPO task force, which would confiscate frozen assets to finance the rebuilding of war-torn Ukraine. According to Justice Minister Beat Jans, Switzerland had an interest not to join the task force in order "to continue to offer good services". Switzerland held a two-day Ukraine peace conference in the historic alpine resort Burgenstock on 15 to 16 June 2024.

According to the Tages Anzeiger in 2024, Swiss banks, including Julius Bär maintained business relations with people close to President Putin, despite international sanctions.

According to swissinfo in 2023, military drones made in Russia had "Swiss and other European components" such as GPS navigation systems.

In late October 2025, Switzerland tightened Russia sanctions in the oil and gas sector, but essentially refrained from imposing a transaction ban on Chinese financial institutions. These measures came on the heel of increased U.S. sanctions on the Russian petroleum industry as well as Chinese energy commodities.

== Resident diplomatic missions ==
At the end of 2018, there were 732 Swiss nationals living in Russia. As of 2020, 16,500 Russian nationals lived in Switzerland. There are 70,000 Russian speakers in Switzerland (2022).

- Russia has an embassy in Bern and a consulate-general in Geneva.
- Switzerland has an embassy in Moscow and a consulate-general in Saint Petersburg. In 2018, Switzerland issued around 20,000 visas.
- As of 2022, Switzerland represents the interests of Georgia in Russia and vice versa.
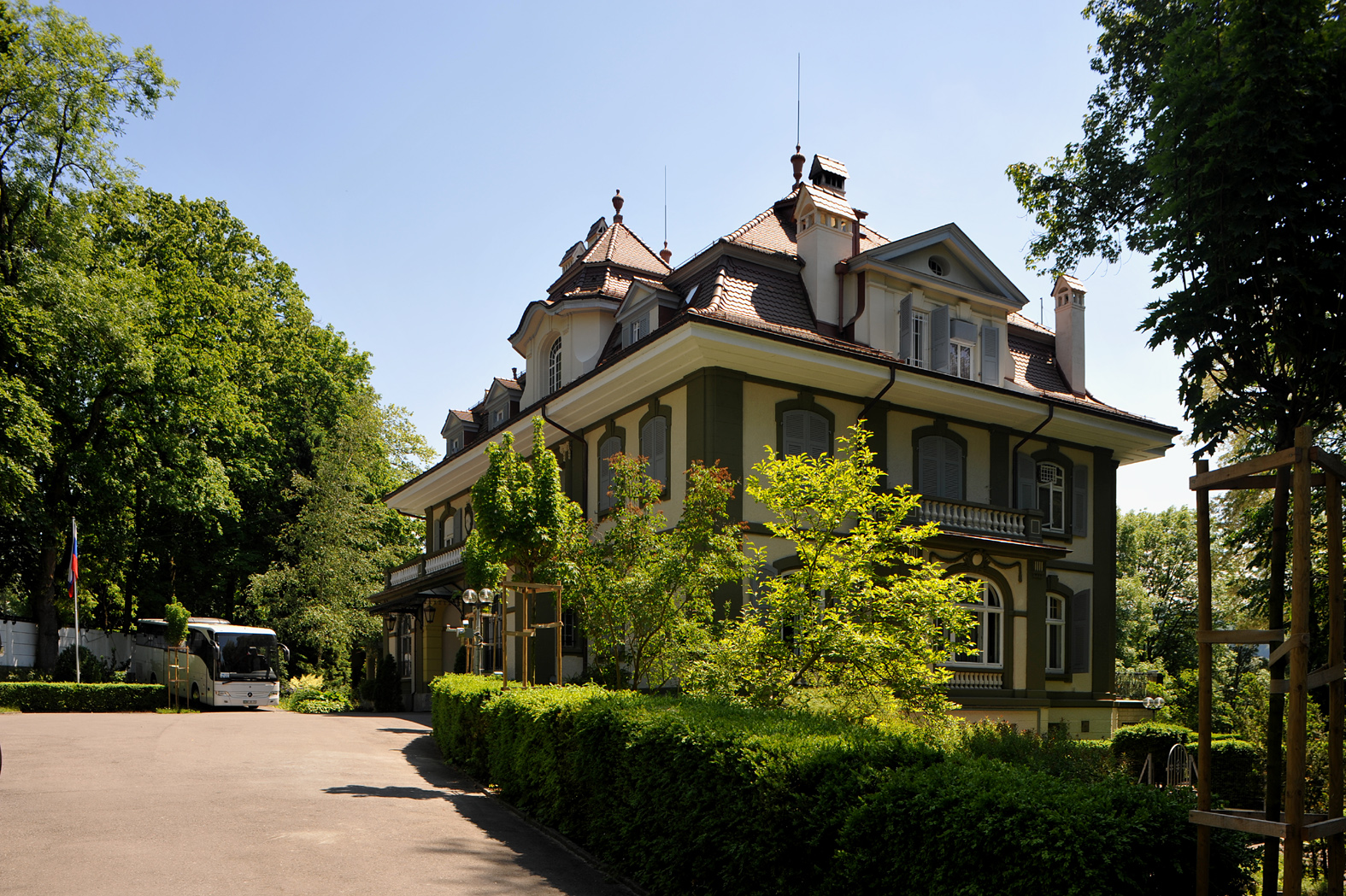
Embassy of Russia in Bern

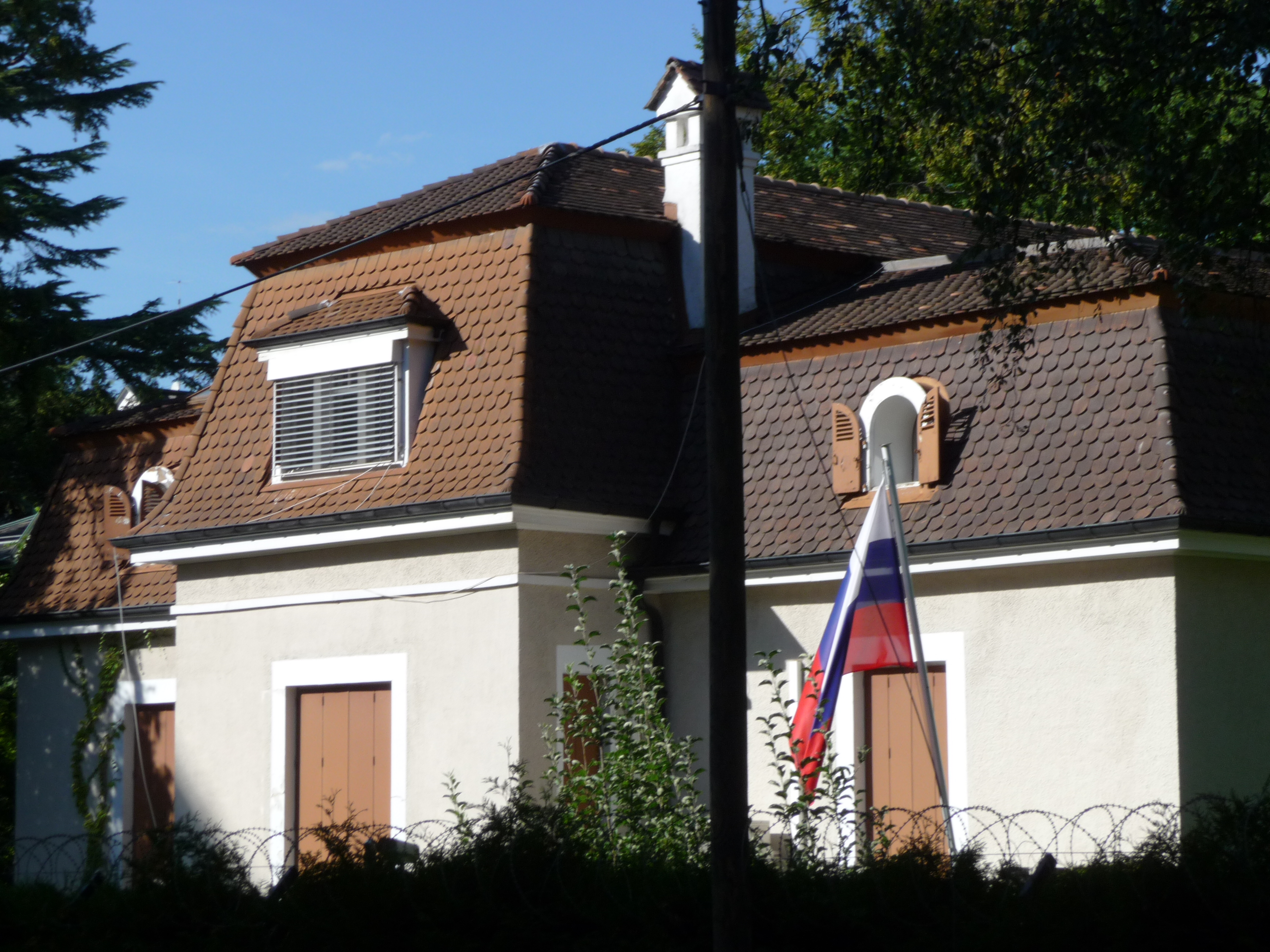
Consulate-General of Russia in Geneva

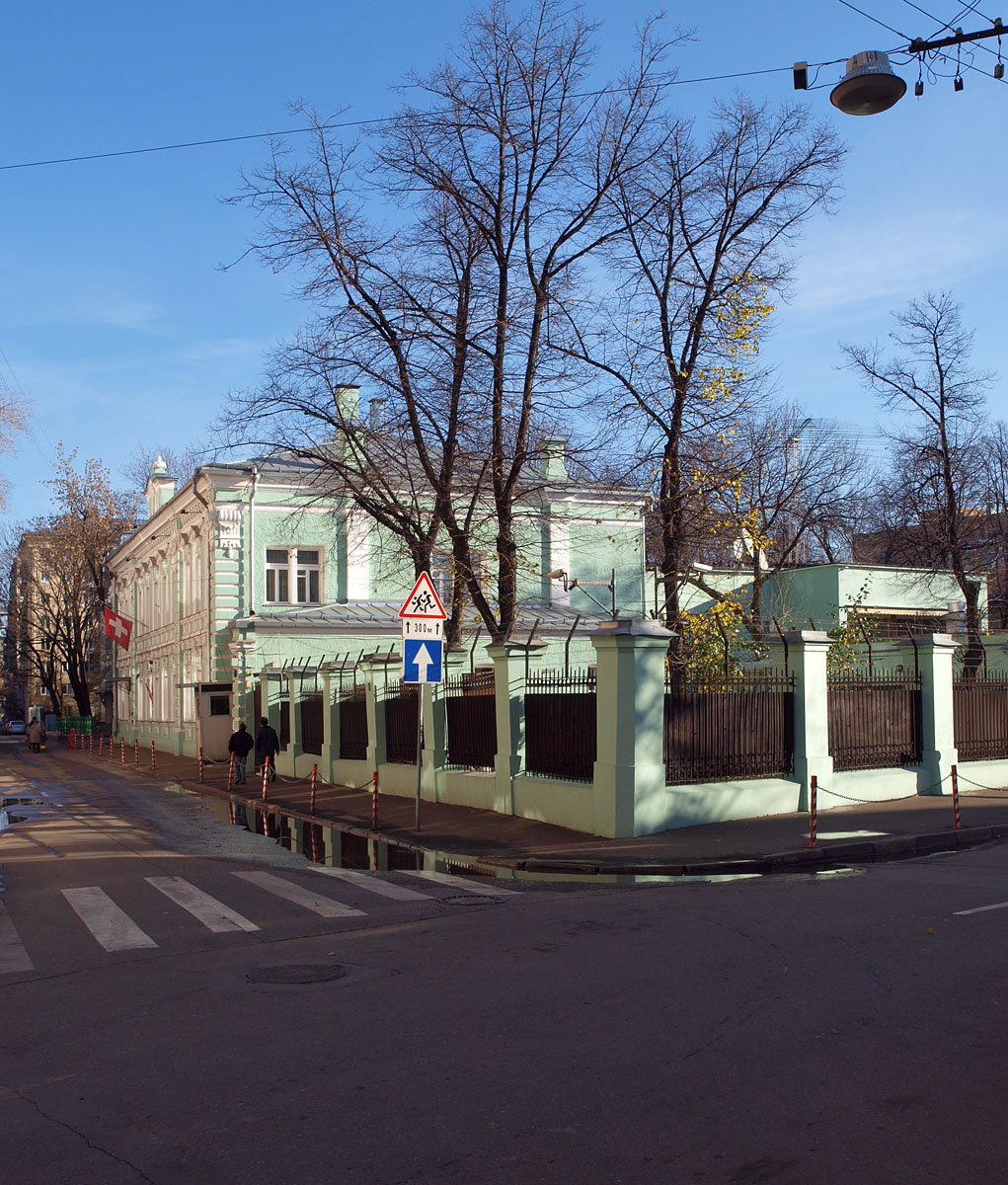
Embassy of Switzerland in Moscow

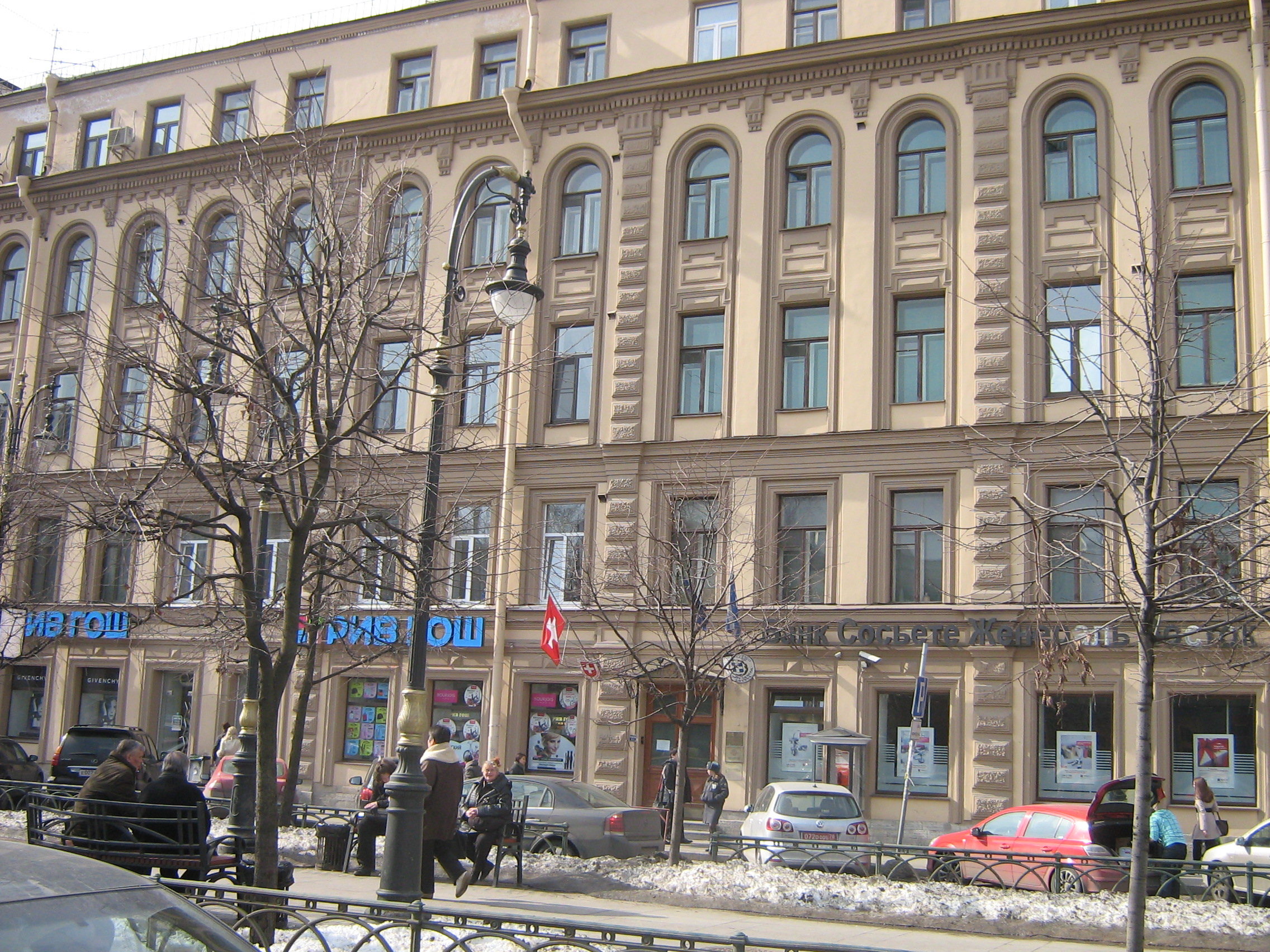
Consulate-General of Switzerland in Saint Petersburg

== Trade ==
Russia is Switzerland's 23rd largest trading partners with a trade volume of $5.1 billion. Russia accounts for 1% of Swiss exports and 0.4% of Swiss imports. Switzerland mainly exports medicines, medical products, watches and machinery to Russia, while the chief imports are gold, precious metals and aluminum.

Switzerland is a major hub for commodities trading globally. As such, about 80% of Russia's commodity trading goes through Geneva and with a further estimated 40 commodities companies linked to Russia in Zug. Gunvor, Vitol, Trafigura and Lukoil Litasco SA are oil and commodities trading firms with stakes in Rosneft and Lukoil, two major Russian oil companies. Paramount Energy, Amur Trading, Cetracore, Mercantile & Maritime and Sunrise are reportedly also active players in this sector. As of June 2023, Gunvor and Vitol were the only western-owned companies still among the top-ten buyers of Russian refined petroleum. The top four Swiss commodity traders Vitol, Cargill, Glencore and Trafigura, made a combined $50 billion in profits in 2022, five times more than in the previous decade, also because traders were producing additional profits from buying cheaper and sanctioned oil cargoes and selling them at a hefty profit.

MMK (a Russian-based company in Lugano) is a major player in the commodities/steel trading with Eastern Europe. EuroChem and SUEK are respectively two major Russian fertilizer and coal companies with a subsidiary in Zug. KSL, another Russian coal company linked to President Putin with offices in Zug, has been banned from operating in Switzerland since September 2022.

The headquarters of Russia's Nord Stream 2 pipeline project linking Russia with Germany are in Switzerland. Nord Stream 2 AG filed for bankruptcy on 1 March 2022 and laid off all 106 employees in Zug.

Gas makes up roughly 15% of Switzerland's final energy consumption. Around half of this comes from Russia (via Germany). Russia supplies only 0.3% of Swiss imports of crude oil.

Switzerland is also a major hub for Russian (and Ukrainian) grain and vegetable oil trading.

Sberbank, Gazprombank and VTB Bank have a branch in Switzerland, the largest recipient of Russian private capital. Between $5 billion and $10 billion of private Russian money flows through Switzerland every year.

According to the Neue Zürcher Zeitung, the amount deposited in Swiss banks by Russian nationals amounts to some $150 billion but according to the Bank of International Settlements, Russian nationals have only ~$11 billion deposited in Swiss bank accounts. When including brokerage accounts, other investments and assets held through offshore accounts, the estimated amount was between $100 and $300 billion in 2022. According to the Swiss Bankers Association in 2022, the amount held by Russian clients in Swiss banks is between $160 and $214 billion. As of 2023, Switzerland was holding CHF10 billion for the Russian Central Bank.

200 Swiss companies employing some 40,000 people in Russia have registered with the Swiss Embassy in Moscow. Some of these companies, such as ABB, Holcim, Sulzer and Nestlé, have suspended or significantly reduced their operations in Russia, while Christoph Blocher's EMS-Chemie or Liebherr continue "business as usual". As of February 2023, only 18 Swiss companies had completely exited the Russian market. Another source in Ukraine says 77 companies headquartered in Switzerland were still active in Russia as of July 2023. However, Switzerland by far is not the only country that keeps doing business with Russia under sanctions. In 2026, the government of Russia took control of two subsidiaries of Nestlé in the country by “compulsory administration”.

Up until 2022, Switzerland was a significant importer of Russian gold that was destined for refineries or jewelry production. Since August 2022, buying, importing or transporting gold and gold products from Russia are banned because of the sanctions. But a provision in Swiss law allows its companies’ overseas subsidiaries to trade Russian commodities (including gold or oil) as long as they are “legally independent".

Russian investments represent only 1% of annual foreign direct investment into Switzerland (2022).

As of December 2021, Credit Suisse had about $900 million credit exposure to Russia while UBS had only $200 million exposure to Russian assets. Other sources say UBS had $634 million “at direct risk” in Russia and Credit Suisse $1.7 billion.

About 4% (i.e. $33 billion) of Credit Suisse wealth management business is with rich Russian clients. Swiss Bank Julius Bär has also reportedly been used by Russian nationals to launder money.

Swiss pension funds have on average between 0.3% and 0.5% of assets invested in Russia.

In 2019, Russian visitors represented 1.7% of hotel nights in Switzerland.

According to 2022 trade information, exports to Russia have increased 19% while imports have risen 54% since the Ukraine war began. The sizable increase of imports is dominated by gold, which increased in value in late 2022. Switzerland had outlawed direct gold imports from Russia in August 2022, but this had little impact on the import of Russian gold. It is believed that some gold exports transit via Kazakhstan or Uzbekistan to avoid sanctions. Exports to Russia from Switzerland were mostly pharmaceutical products, which are exempt under current sanctions.

According to the Swiss newspaper Neue Zürcher Zeitung, sanctions imposed on the Russian commodity trade had a significant impact on the trade of Russian petroleum as well as copper and wheat. In 2022, trade figures still indicated an increase to 88.5 billion CHF, but in 2023, Swiss commodity traders lowered their exposure to 18.5 billion CHF, a significant decline that also reflects lower prices on the market.

== Individuals ==
Sergei Mikhailov, a Russian businessman and alleged leader of the “Solntsevskaya Bratva” criminal syndicate was arrested in Geneva in 1996 and incarcerated for two years.

Swiss police arrested Russian businessman Vladislav Klyushin while en route to Zermatt in 2021 and extradited him to the United States on charges of commercial espionage.

Known Russian oligarchs living in Switzerland are Viktor Vekselberg (Renova Group), Alisher Usmanov (USM) and Gennady Timchenko (Gunvor/Volga Group). The Swiss government has extended EU sanctions onto these individuals after the 2022 Russian invasion of Ukraine. Switzerland further imposed travel bans on five unnamed Russian oligarchs with close ties to President Putin.

Andrey Melnichenko (MDM Bank) reportedly lives in St-Moritz.

Dmitry Pumpyansky (OAO TMK/Sinara Group) reportedly lives in Geneva with his family.

Petr Aven (Alfa-Bank) has reportedly a residence in Bern.

Sergei Popov (MDM Bank) lives in Canton de Vaud.

Oleg Tinkov, a Russian billionaire and entrepreneur, reportedly lives in Switzerland.

According to United States and European security officials, Alina Kabaeva has spent long periods of time in Switzerland since 2015, at residences in Lugano and Cologny. In March 2015, she was reported to have given birth to a daughter at the VIP hospital of Saint Ann in Ticino, Switzerland. Kabaeva has been sanctioned by the United States, the European Union and the United Kingdom.

According to Cyprus Confidential documents released by the International Consortium of Investigative Journalists in 2023, at least 20 Russian oligarchs had Swiss bank accounts.

In addition, about 85 Russian nationals held “Golden Visas” in Switzerland in 2022.

Swiss-Cameroonian dual-national and influencer Nathalie Yamb was sanctioned in 2025 by the E.U. for connections to "Russian propaganda".

In 2025, the E.U. sanctioned Swiss citizen and ex-intelligence Officer Jacques Baud for being a propagandist for Russia.

== See also ==
- Swiss emigration to Russia
- List of ambassadors of Russia to Switzerland
