= Parliamentary Committees in Switzerland =

Legislative committees in Switzerland

Parliamentary committees (French: commissions parlementaires; German: Parlamentarische Kommissionen; Italian: commissioni parlamentari) are specialized bodies composed of members of the legislature in Switzerland at the federal, cantonal, and communal levels. These small working groups conduct detailed legislative work outside of plenary sessions, including examination of government proposals, development of initiatives, drafting of bills, and oversight of the government, administration, and judiciary.

This article focuses primarily on committees at the federal level, within the Federal Assembly, which is Switzerland's bicameral parliament consisting of the National Council (lower house) and the Council of States (upper house).

== History ==
Parliamentary committees have existed since Switzerland's early federal institutions. The Federal Diet and both chambers of the Helvetic Republic already employed committees. However, the Federal Assembly only began assigning mandates for entire legislative periods in the early 20th century: in 1903 for the finance committees of both councils, in 1920 for the National Council's Control Committee, and in 1927 for that of the Council of States.

Throughout the 20th century, a mixed system combining standing and non-standing committees developed. For a long time, there was resistance to expanding standing committees, based on concerns about excessive specialization of parliamentarians and fears by the government of encroachment by the legislative branch. In 1991, recognizing that a militia parliament could not cope with the continuous growth of its tasks without technical professionalization, the law preventing service beyond six years in a committee was abolished and a system of standing committees was created, with twelve for each chamber.

Most cantons have followed a similar evolution, with control committees typically being permanent while legislative committees remain non-permanent, though some cantons adopted standing committee systems even before the federal level.

== Organization at the federal level ==
=== Types and function ===
The National Council and the Council of States each maintain their own separate committees. Both councils have nine specialist committees and two supervisory committees, with the National Council additionally having an Immunity Committee. This means that for each of the nine specialist committees and two supervisory committees listed below, there is one committee in the National Council and a separate corresponding committee in the Council of States.

==== Specialist committees ====
Specialist committees conduct preliminary examination of matters within their domain, monitor social and political developments in their areas of competence, develop proposals, and ensure that effectiveness evaluations are conducted. The domains of competence are established by the Bureau.

The nine types of specialist committees of both councils are:

- Foreign Affairs Committee (FAC)
- Science, Education and Culture Committee (SECC)
- Social Security and Health Committee (SSHC)
- Environment, Spatial Planning and Energy Committee (ESPEC)
- Security Policy Committee (SPC)
- Transport and Telecommunications Committee (TTC)
- Economic Affairs and Taxation Committee (EATC)
- Political Institutions Committee (PIC)
- Legal Affairs Committee (LAC)

==== Supervisory committees ====
The supervisory committees and their delegations exercise high-level oversight over the Confederation's finances and the management of the Federal Council, federal administration, federal courts, the supervisory authority of the Federal Public Prosecutor's Office, the Office itself, and other bodies or persons entrusted with federal tasks. In exercising their mandate, they verify:

- That federal authorities act in accordance with the Constitution and law (legality)
- That state measures are appropriate and that the Federal Council makes good use of its decision-making margin (expediency)
- That state measures achieve their intended effects (effectiveness)
- That means employed by state actors are proportionate to the desired result (economic efficiency)

The two supervisory committees are:

- Finance Committee (FC)
- Control Committee (CC)

===== Other committees =====
In addition to these separate committees for each council, there are also joint committees that serve both chambers. The councils maintain joint committees including:

- Drafting Committee: verifies texts and establishes their definitive version before the final vote.
- Control Committee Delegation
- Finance Delegation
- Permanent delegations for international parliamentary relations: represent the Federal Assembly at such assemblies, while other delegations maintain relations with parliaments of other states.

The Federal Assembly (when both chambers sit together) also maintains two committees:

- Judicial Committee: prepares the election and dismissal of judges of the federal courts, the attorney general of the Confederation and deputies, and members of the Supervisory Authority of the Federal Public Prosecutor's Office.
- Committee on Pardons: handles pardons concerning judgments by the Federal Criminal Court or a federal administrative authority, as well as military criminal matters judged by the Federal Court; also conducts preliminary examination of jurisdictional conflicts between the supreme authorities of the Confederation.

In exceptional cases, the councils can establish special committees (ad hoc committees) to examine specific matters, including parliamentary inquiry committees charged with investigating events of major significance.

Committees may establish subcommittees within themselves for specific mandates. Unlike specialist committees, supervisory committees can also establish permanent subcommittees. The Foreign Affairs Committee of the National Council maintains a permanent subcommittee on European questions.

=== Composition ===
In the National Council, the Bureau determines the number of committee members, typically 25. In the Council of States, the number is fixed by the council's rules at 13 members. In both councils, committee seats are distributed among parliamentary groups proportionally. The Bureau of each council appoints committee members and their leadership (president and vice-president), with National Council members nominated by their parliamentary groups.

Committee members are generally appointed for four years, with their mandate ending no later than the complete renewal of committees during the first session of a new legislature. Mandates are renewable. Presidents and vice-presidents serve two-year terms and cannot be reappointed to the same position.

If a vacancy occurs during a mandate, the seat is filled for the remaining duration. In the National Council, an extraordinary complete renewal of committees for the remaining mandate period occurs if a parliamentary group's numerical strength changes such that it is over- or under-represented by more than one member in a standing committee, or if a new parliamentary group is formed.

== Procedures ==
=== Working methods ===
To exercise their functions, committees may deposit initiatives and parliamentary interventions, make proposals and present reports, call upon external experts, hear representatives of cantons and interested parties, and conduct visits. Supervisory committees and their delegations may additionally address recommendations to responsible authorities.

Committees meet on average twice per quarter. Unless otherwise specified by law or the rules of their council, committees are subject to the procedural rules applicable to their council.

=== Confidentiality and public information ===
Unlike council deliberations, committee proceedings are confidential. This confidentiality aims to facilitate the development of pragmatic solutions capable of obtaining a majority. Between 1990 and 1994, compromises developed in committees were adopted by the Federal Assembly chambers in 94% of cases.

Committees inform the public through the media about principal decisions taken, voting results, and major arguments presented during deliberations. Information about how individual members voted or opinions they defended remains confidential. The principle of confidentiality applies to committee session minutes and documents. The Transparency Act does not apply to committee documents, even when submitted by the administration. Distribution and consultation of committee documents are regulated by parliamentary law.

Although committees have the possibility of conducting public hearings, they rarely do so.
