= Repo (name) =

Repo is a surname. Notable people with the surname include:

- Eino S. Repo (1919–2002), president of Yleisradio
- Heikki Repo (1871–1931), Finnish politician
- Juhani Repo (born 1948), Finnish cross country skier
- Matti Repo (born 1959), Finnish prelate
- Mauri Repo (1945–2002), Finnish athletics coach
- Mitro Repo (born 1958), Finnish priest
- Pentti Repo (1930–1997), Finnish athlete
- Sami Repo (born 1971), Finnish cross country skier
- Satu Repo, Canadian writer and academic
- Sebastian Repo (born 1996), Finnish ice hockey player
- Seppo Repo (born 1947), Finnish ice hockey player

== See also ==
- Liisa Repo-Martell, Canadian actress and artist
- Repo (disambiguation)
