= Repo (disambiguation) =

A repo or repurchase agreement is a financial instrument.

Repo may also refer to:

== Finance ==
- Repossession of collateral, for a defaulted loan
- Repo 105, an accounting maneuver
- Russian Elites, Proxies, and Oligarchs Task Force

== Music, arts and entertainment ==
- Repo! The Genetic Opera, 2008 film by Darren Lynn Bousman
- Repo (album), 2009 album by Black Dice
- Operation Repo, a TV show
- Repo Games, a TV show
- Repo Man (disambiguation)
- Repo Man (film), a 1984 film by Alex Cox
- Repo Men, a 2010 film by Miguel Sapochnik
- Repo Chick
- R.E.P.O., a 2025 video game developed by Semiwork

== People ==
- Repo (name), list of people with the name

== Technology ==
- Software repository, a stockpile of software assets such as binaries and source code available on the Internet
- Repository (version control), a metadata store used in a version control system
  - Repo, a multiple Git repository tool

== See also ==
- Repository (disambiguation)
