= Swiss emigration to Russia =

Swiss people in the Russian Empire

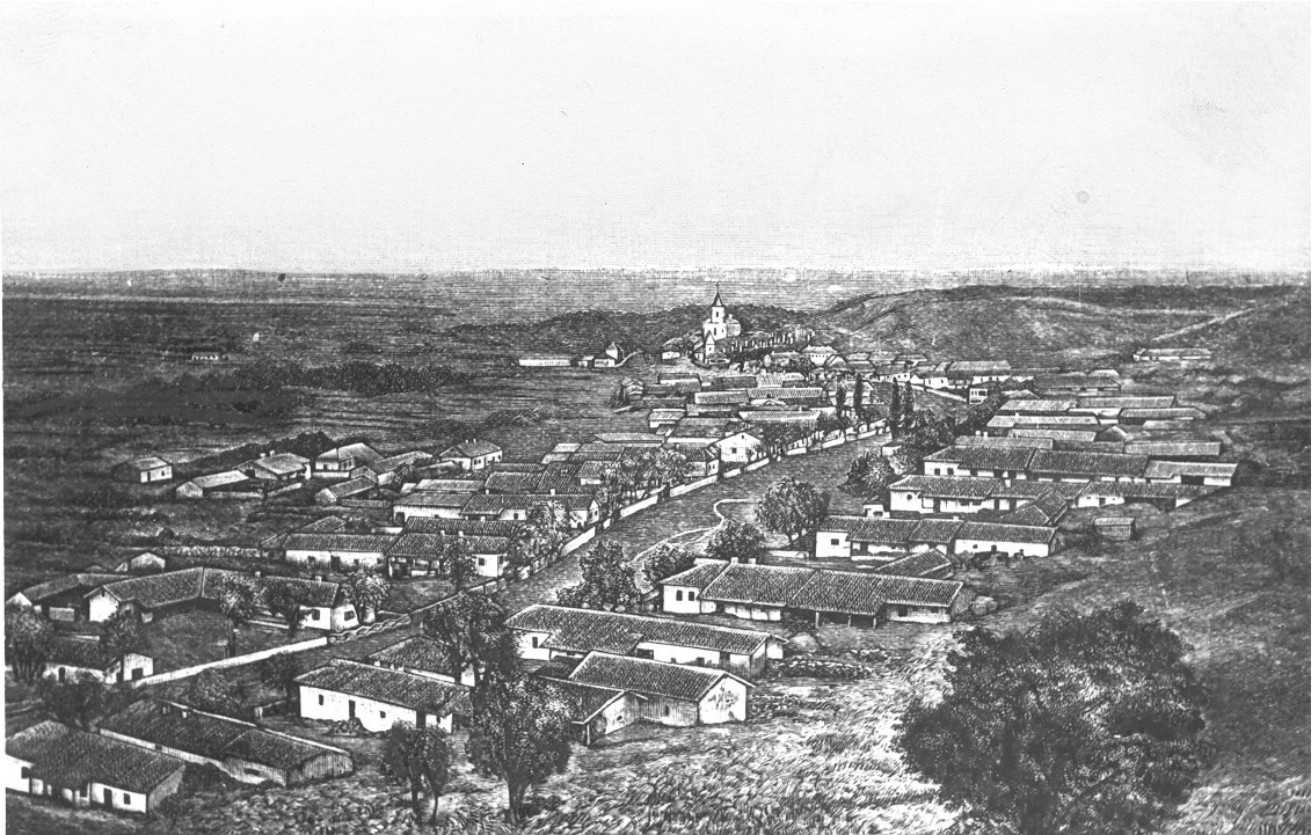
Early-20th-century view of the town of Zürichtal (now Zolotoe Pole) in Crimea, Taurida Governorate, founded by Swiss immigrants in 1805.

There was significant emigration of Swiss people to the Russian Empire from the late 17th to the late 19th century. Rauber (1985) estimates that a number of 50,000 to 60,000 Swiss lived in Russia between roughly 1700 and 1917.

== Overview ==
The late 18th and early 19th century saw a flow of Swiss farmers forming colonies such as Şaba (Bessarabia, at the Dniester Liman, now part of Ukraine), besides specialists of various professions, working as winemakers, cheesemakers, merchants, officers or governesses. The Russian-Swiss generally prospered, partly merging with German diaspora populations. Early Swiss emigrants to Russia were not poor, but brought money with them, establishing themselves as specialist elites, choosing Russia as migration target because it offered greater opportunities for their trades than America. Only in the later 19th century, with Russian industrialization, saw significant migration of lower social classes.

Most of these Swiss diaspora populations returned to Switzerland during the interwar period in the wake of the Russian Revolution of 1917, and especially as a result of the Dekulakization under Joseph Stalin during 1929-1931.

The most famous Swiss to have lived in Russia are probably the mathematician Leonhard Euler and the military officer Franz Lefort, a close associate of Peter the Great. Lefortovo district in modern Moscow still bears his name. Other notable Russian-Swiss include botanist Johannes Ammann, artist and architect Leonhard Christian Gottlieb Leonardowitsch Schaufelberger, entrepreneur Arnold Schaufelberger, politician Frederic Cesar de la Harpe and general Antoine Henri Jomini in the tsarist period and Fritz Platten and Jules Humbert-Droz in the Soviet period. In 1918, Platten saved Vladimir Lenin's life in St. Petersburg, and in 1923, a Russian-Swiss assassinated Bolshevik leader Vatslav Vorovskii in Lausanne.

The Swiss-Russian connection went both ways, and Switzerland was a destination for holidays, studies and exile for Bolsheviks and anti-Bolsheviks alike. Notably, Zürich played host to both Lenin and Aleksandr Solzhenitsyn, and in the years predating the Revolution, up to a third of students at Swiss universities were citizens of Tsarist Russia.

Since 1978, the History Department at the University of Zürich under Carsten Goehrke has been assembling an archive of historical documents relating to Swiss emigrants in Russia (now accessible at the Swiss Social Archives, Zurich). The archive collects records of some 5,600 individuals who had come to Switzerland following the collapse of the tsarist state claiming Swiss citizenship, estimated to correspond to about two thirds of the total number.

In 2006, there was a number of 676 Swiss citizens registered to permanently reside in Russia, or 100 more than in the preceding year. The 2021 Russian census recorded 78 individuals who claimed their ethnic group as Swiss.

== See also ==
- Swiss diaspora
- Swiss American
- Swiss people
- Beresinalied
- Foreign relations of Switzerland
- History of German settlement in Central and Eastern Europe
- Russia–Switzerland relations

== Literature ==
- Bühler Roman, Gander-Wolf Heidi, Goehrke Carsten, Rauber Urs, Tschudin Gisela, Voegeli Josef, "Schweizer im Zarenreich - Zur Geschichte der Auswanderung nach Russland", Zürich, Verlag Hans Rohr, 1985
- Bühler Roman, "Auswanderung aus Graubünden in das russische Zarenreich", Zürich, Verlag Hans Rohr, 1988
- Collmer Peter, "Die besten Jahre unseres Lebens. Russlandschweizerinnen und Russlandschweizer in Selbstzeugnissen, 1821—1999", Zürich: Chronos Verlag 2001, ISBN 978-3-0340-0508-1
- Collmer Peter, "Die Schweiz und das Russische Reich 1848–1919. Geschichte einer europäischen Verflechtung" (Die Schweiz und der Osten Europas 10), Zürich, Chronos Verlag 2004.
- Goehrke Carsten (ed.): "Die Fremde als Heimat - Russlandschweizer erinnern sich", Zürich, Verlag Hans Rohr, 1988
- Goehrke Carsten, Schweizer in Russland. Zur Geschichte einer Kontinentalwanderung, RSH 48, 1998, 289-290.
- Lengen Markus, "Ein Strukturprofil der letzten Russlandschweizer-Generation am Vorabend des Ersten Weltkrieges", Schweizerische Zeitschrift für Geschichte 48 (1998), 360-390
- Maeder Eva, "Auswanderungsziel: Russland. Schweizer Alltag im Zarenreich und im Sowjetstaat", Der Landbote, 29.12.2001, p. 20
- Mumenthaler Rudolf, "Das Russlandschweizer-Archiv. Entstehung und Aufbau", Carsten Goehrke (Hrsg.): 25 Jahre Osteuropa-Abteilung des Historischen Seminars der Universität Zürich 1971—1996. Zürich 1996, 37—45.
- Mumenthaler Rudolf, "Schweizer im Nordwesten des Zarenreichs. In: Der Finnische Meerbusen als Brennpunkt. Wandern und Wirken deutschsprachiger Menschen im europäischen Nordosten", ed. Robert Schweitzer, Waltraud Bastman-Bühner. Helsinki 1998, 145-165
- Rauber Urs, "Schweizer Industrie in Russland - Ein Beitrag zur Geschichte der industriellen Emigration, des Kapitalexportes und des Handels der Schweiz mit dem Russischen Zarenreich", Zürich, Verlag Hans Rohr, 1985
- Schneider Harry, "Schweizer Theologen im Zarenreich (1700-1917)", Auswanderung und russischer Alltag von Theologen und ihren Frauen, Zürich, Verlag Hans Rohr, 1994.
- Tschudin Gisela, "Schweizer Käser in Russland", Zürich, Verlag Hans Rohr, 1988
- Voegeli Josef, "Die Rückkehr der Russlandschweizer 1917-1945", Zürich, Verlag Hans Rohr, 1988
- Jost Soom, Avancement et fortune: Schweizer und ihre Nachkommen als Offiziere, Diplomaten und Hofbeamte im Dienst des Zarenreiches, Beiträge zur Geschichte der Russlandschweizer, Hans Rohr (1996), ISBN 978-3-85865-633-9
- Alfred Erich Senn, Review of Bühler et al. (1985), Rauber (1985), Slavic Review (1986), p. 332f.
