= Criminal procedure law in Switzerland =

Criminal procedure law, also referred to as formal criminal law or formal procedure law, has been uniformly regulated in Switzerland since the enactment of the Criminal Procedure Code (CrimPC) (Note: German: Schweizerische Strafprozessordnung, StPO; French: Code de procédure pénale, CPP; Italian: Codice di procedura penale, CPP) on 1 January 2011. Prior to this, the Swiss legal system comprised 26 cantonal codes of criminal procedure, along with a federal Criminal Procedure Code that applied to specific offenses under federal jurisdiction. Additionally, separate Criminal Procedure Codes exist for military criminal law and juvenile criminal law; these have not been replaced by the federal Criminal Procedure Code.

== Introduction ==
Substantive criminal law specifies the rights and duties of individuals, and describes what behaviors are crimes, classifies them into different levels of seriousness, and lays out the punishments. It is governed by the Swiss Criminal Code.

Procedural criminal law, or formal criminal law, specifies the procedures for enforcing substantive criminal law. It governs how criminal cases are investigated, prosecuted, adjudicated, and how penalties are implemented. In Switzerland, formal criminal law includes criminal procedure, rules of evidence, defendants' rights, and enforcement of judgments.

== Preliminary proceedings ==
Criminal proceedings are structured into preliminary and main proceedings, with a distinction made between the investigation procedure and the investigative phase within the preliminary proceedings. If an appeal is filed against a verdict in the main proceedings or if a revision is sought based on new evidence, appellate proceedings may be initiated.

=== Investigation procedure ===
The investigation procedure commences with either a private or official complaint (Art. 300–302). During this phase, the police conduct investigations and may make provisional arrests (Art. 306). Crime scenes are examined by the police, who then forward their findings to the senior public prosecutor's office (Art. 307 para. 3). The public prosecutor's office is responsible for deciding on further investigative actions and may choose to discontinue proceedings (Arts. 309, 310). As the primary authority in the proceedings, the public prosecutor's office can initiate and carry out preliminary investigations even in the absence of police involvement. Individuals arrested during pre-trial proceedings have the right to legal counsel from the outset (Art. 159), owing their lawyer to be present during police questioning. Following the initial questioning of the accused, a request to inspect the files of the criminal proceedings may be made, provided that essential evidence has already been gathered by the public prosecutor's office (Art. 101). However, access to these files may be restricted if there are concerns about the potential abuse of this right, if the content poses a security risk to individuals, or if there are interests related to public or private secrecy (Art. 102 para. 1, 149 para. 2 lit. e).

=== Investigation ===
The public prosecutor's office is responsible for overseeing the investigation (Art. 61) and conducts interrogations of the accused and witnesses, either directly or through designated police members from the Confederation or the canton (Art. 142 para. 2). The Confederation or the canton may also authorize courts, the public prosecutor's office, and penal authorities to carry out various interrogations (Art. 142 para. 1). The public prosecutor's office gathers evidence from both the defense and the police (Arts. 311 and 313) in order to request coercive measures from the coercive measures court (Art. 224), such as remand. Any complaints regarding the actions of the police, the public prosecutor's office, or coercive measures are addressed by the appropriate federal or cantonal complaints authority (Art. 20). If no resolution is reached between the plaintiff and the defendant (Art. 316), the public prosecutor's office will make a determination on whether to proceed with an indictment or to discontinue the proceedings (Arts. 318, 319).

== Main proceedings ==
Upon receipt of the indictment, the court assumes authority over the proceedings based on the indictment and accompanying documents (Art. 328). If the court determines that a judgment cannot be issued based on these materials, it may abandon or suspend the proceedings or require the prosecution to supplement and correct the indictment and the files (Art. 329 para. 1-3). The prosecution is also allowed to amend the indictment if the court believes that the facts presented could constitute a different criminal offense. Additionally, it may include in the indictment any offenses that have come to light during the main proceedings, provided they fall within the court's jurisdiction (Art. 329 para. 4). Indictments that exceed the court's competence may be transferred to a competent court without appeal. A case may be dismissed by the court on all counts or individual counts upon the pronouncement of the judgment (Art. 329 para. 5).

=== Preliminary hearings ===
The director of proceedings may schedule a preliminary hearing to clarify organizational matters with the involved parties or to facilitate settlement negotiations. If necessary, evidence that cannot be included in the trial may be collected during the preliminary hearing. Evidence that will be presented at the trial will also be disclosed (Art. 332).

=== Trial ===
The accused is required to be present at the trial if the case involves a felony or misdemeanor, or if ordered by the director of proceedings (Art. 336 para. 1). Defense lawyers must always be present (Art. 336 para. 2). The public prosecutor's office may be absent from the hearing and participate by submitting a written request, provided that the required sentence is less than one year of imprisonment and they have not been requested to be present by the director of proceedings. If either the prosecution or the defense is absent without excuse, the trial will be postponed. If the defendant repeatedly fails to appear without an excuse, the trial may proceed in their absence (Art. 336-337). Private plaintiffs may be represented or submit written motions (Art. 338).

The trial begins with preliminary issues raised by the parties regarding the trial, the indictment, and the hearing. The court addresses and determines these issues immediately after hearing from the parties present. Once these preliminary matters are concluded, the indictment cannot be withdrawn or supplemented, and the evidentiary proceedings commence (Art. 339-340).

Initially, the director of proceedings questions the accused about their circumstances, the charges, and the results of the preliminary hearings. The parties may then pose supplementary questions through the director or with their permission. The parties can also submit motions to present further evidence (Art. 343). The party hearing concludes with presentations from both the public prosecutor and the defense, after which the accused has the opportunity to speak last (Art. 347). Following this, the court retires for secret deliberation (Art. 348 para. 1), with the clerk of the court participating in the determination of the verdict in an advisory capacity (Art. 348 para. 2). If a verdict cannot yet be reached, another party hearing will be scheduled; otherwise, the verdict for each count is determined by a democratic process (Art. 351).

== Legal action ==
=== Appeal ===
An appeal may be filed within 10 days following the issuance of the judgment. The time limit begins on the day after the opening of the appeal. Appeals can be submitted in writing or orally on the record (Art. 399 para. 1). Within 20 days after the delivery of the reasoned judgment, a detailed written statement of appeal must be submitted to the Court of Appeal, specifying the scope of the appeal, the desired changes to the judgment, and requests for evidence (Art. 399 para. 3). If the statement of appeal is incomplete or incorrect, the Court of Appeal will set a new time limit for correction. The appeal will have a suspensive effect concerning the challenged elements (Art. 402). The Court of Appeal will render a new judgment, which may either replace or confirm the judgment of the lower court (Art. 408). If significant flaws occurred during the first-instance proceedings, the Court of Appeal may order a new trial, which may involve repeating all or certain procedural acts (Art. 409).

=== Review ===
A review of a judgment may be requested from the Court of Appeal to protect human rights and fundamental freedoms (ECHR) or if the judgment is in irreconcilable conflict with a subsequent judgment; a time limit of 90 days applies for such requests. An appeal based on new evidence or known criminal interference with the trial can be requested indefinitely, in favor of the convicted person, even beyond the statute of limitations (Art. 410). If a convicted individual is acquitted as a result of the appeal, any fines are repaid, and compensation for deprivation of liberty is provided, provided this cannot be attributed to other criminal acts (Art. 415).

== Special procedures ==
=== Penalty proceedings ===
If the accused confesses during the preliminary hearings or if the case facts are sufficiently clarified, the public prosecutor's office may issue a penalty order, provided it deems this punishment sufficient. Possible penalties include fines, fines of up to 180 daily rates, up to 6 months of imprisonment, or combinations of these, not exceeding a total of 6 months imprisonment. A fine can always be imposed (Art. 352). A written objection to the penalty order can be submitted within 10 days. If no appeal is lodged, the penalty order is considered a final judgment (Art. 354). In the event of an objection, the public prosecutor decides whether to discontinue the proceedings or to submit the penalty order as an indictment to the court for trial. The public prosecutor's office may also gather new evidence (Art. 355). If the court rejects the penalty order, the public prosecutor's office will restart the preliminary proceedings. If the objection pertains only to costs and compensation, the court may conduct the proceedings in writing, provided no hearing has been requested (Art. 356).

=== Misdemeanor criminal proceedings ===
Misdemeanor criminal proceedings are specially regulated, as the Confederation and cantons may transfer the prosecution and adjudication of misdemeanors to administrative authorities (Art. 17 para. 1). These authorities possess the same powers as the public prosecutor's office for this purpose (Art. 357 para. 1), though their powers are limited in certain areas, such as coercive measures. Cantons may also allow the accused to be defended by a layperson in misdemeanor proceedings (Art. 127 para. 5).

Typically, the proceedings conclude with a penalty order. However, if the facts of the offense are not met, the penal authority will discontinue the proceedings with a brief order (Art. 357 para. 3). If no opening order is issued, the public prosecutor's office or misdemeanor authority will issue a non-acceptance order. Should the authority determine that the case pertains to a felony or another misdemeanor, it will refer the matter to the public prosecutor's office (Art. 357 para. 4).

Questions regarding formal proceedings are determined analogously to the provisions on penalty order proceedings, particularly concerning the content and opening of the penalty order as well as objections (Art. 357 para. 2).

=== Accelerated proceedings ===
If the sentence sought by the public prosecutor is less than five years and the accused agrees with the public prosecutor on key factual points, the accused may request an abbreviated trial (Art. 358). If the prosecution, the accused, and the court have no objections, the main proceedings will proceed without taking additional evidence. The court will question the parties involved and compare their statements with the existing files. If the court finds the requested sentence appropriate, it will pronounce it as a verdict; otherwise, the summary proceedings will be discontinued, and ordinary proceedings will commence.

== Costs of proceedings ==
The costs of criminal proceedings encompass expenses for official defense, translations, expert opinions, cooperation with other authorities, and communication costs such as mail and telephone (Art. 422). Costs incurred due to misconduct or unexcused absences may be imposed by the court on the responsible party. If proceedings are initiated negligently or are significantly complicated, the party at fault will be liable for the costs. This also applies if a decision is revised during appeal proceedings. The accused is responsible for the costs if they are not acquitted or if they initiated the proceedings willfully (Art. 426). Conversely, if the accused is acquitted, the proceedings are discontinued, or the action is withdrawn, the plaintiff will be ordered to pay the costs (Art. 427). In cases where a settlement is mediated by the public prosecutor's office, the federal government or canton will bear the costs. Costs for appeal hearings are imposed on the losing party, and the court of appeal determines the allocation of costs for prior hearings.

== Evolutionary history ==
In 1994, the Federal Department of Justice and Police commissioned a committee of experts, which produced a unified preliminary draft of a new Criminal Procedure Code for all cantons in 1998. This draft was sent out for consultation in 2001. The Committee for Legal Affairs of the Council of States unanimously recommended that the Federal Prosecutor be elected by the Federal Assembly and that oversight of the Office of the Federal Prosecutor be assigned to an independent authority. This recommendation was approved by the Federal Council in a timely manner in 2009. The new Criminal Procedure Code, along with the new Juvenile Criminal Procedure Code and the Criminal Authorities Organization Act, came into force on January 1, 2011.

== Criticism ==
=== Costs ===
Even prior to the implementation of the new laws, significant cost disparities among the cantons were a subject of criticism. Eugen David, a member of the Council of States, highlighted these discrepancies, noting that costs could vary by as much as four times, and expressed the need for improvements.

=== Covert and Preventive Investigations ===
Another area of concern is the restrictive regulation surrounding undercover and preventive investigations conducted by the police. Specifically, the Criminal Procedure Code imposes more stringent controls on preventive investigations targeting pedophiles compared to the regulations in many cantonal codes of criminal procedure.

=== Penalty order frequently applied ===
The frequent application of penalty orders in Switzerland has also drawn criticism, as it is utilized more commonly than in other jurisdictions.

=== Penalty order – questionable in terms of the rule of law ===
Criminal lawyer Kenad Melunovic Marini observes that since the Criminal Procedure Code came into effect in January 2011, over 90% of criminal proceedings in Switzerland have been resolved through the penalty order procedure (Strafbefehlsverfahren). This Code allows public prosecutors to impose custodial sentences of up to six months without a judge's involvement.

Melunovic critiques this system, arguing that the use of penalty orders—beyond minor offenses, such as traffic violations—approaches constitutional limits and raises significant constitutional concerns. He notes that in this process, the public prosecutor effectively assumes the role of an independent judge. Moreover, he highlights that the focus on efficiency and cost savings within this framework can compromise objectivity and hinder the pursuit of truth.

He further points out the propensity for errors and insufficient investigation in cases involving penalty orders. While these orders may be expedient and cost-effective, they are often flawed. In situations that involve more serious offenses, penalty orders frequently contain inaccuracies due to a lack of thorough case assessment, leading to unjust punishments for individuals who might otherwise not be penalized upon closer examination.

To expedite the process, the accused may not be adequately questioned regarding the allegations or their circumstances. If the accused fails to object, the prosecutorial decision can become a final judgment without further review. Melunovic advises defendants to challenge penalty orders, noting that objections do not require extensive justification. Typically, the public prosecutor's office will arrange a hearing where the defendant can discuss the objection and the underlying case. However, he acknowledges that the costs associated with filing an objection—including investigation and court fees—can escalate, potentially burdening the defendant financially if they are ultimately found guilty.

== See also ==
- Criminal record in Switzerland

== Bibliography ==
- Niklaus Ruckstuhl, Volker Dittmann, Jörg Arnold: Strafprozessrecht unter Einschluss der forensischen Psychiatrie und Rechtsmedizin sowie des kriminaltechnischen und naturwissenschaftlichen Gutachtens. Schulthess Juristische Medien AG, Zürich / Basel / Genf 2011, ISBN 978-3-7255-6352-4.
- Andreas Donatsch, Thomas Hansjakob, Viktor Lieber: Kommentar zur Schweizerischen Strafprozessordnung (StPO). Schulthess Juristische Medien AG, Zürich 2014, ISBN 978-3-7255-6938-0.
