= Political Institutions Committee =

Swiss parliamentary commission

In Switzerland, the Political Institutions Committee (Note: French: Commission des institutions politiques, CIP; German: Staatspolitische Kommission, SPK; Italian: Commissione delle istituzioni politiche, CIP; Romansh: Cumissiun d'instituziuns politicas, CIP) is a federal parliamentary commission that deals with legislative affairs concerning political institutions.

There are two Political Institutions Committees, one for each chamber of the Federal Assembly: the Political Institutions Committee of the National Council (CIP-N), with 25 members, and the Political Institutions Committee of the Council of States (CIP-E), with 13 members.

The CIPs are permanent thematic commissions (or legislative commissions). They were created in 1991.

== Attributions ==
The CIP deals with issues relating to the organization of the federal government and administration, including the division of tasks between the federal authorities, relations between the Confederation and the cantons, political rights, immigrants' rights, and asylum law. They are also responsible for data protection and federal statistics.

== Works ==
During the 51st parliamentary term, the CIP-N set up a sub-committee on “Parliament in crisis situations”, tasked with examining Parliament's ability to act during crises, particularly in the light of the COVID-19 pandemic. During this legislature, the CIPs are also dealing with the issue of electronic voting.

During the 50th legislature, the CIPs dealt with the implementation of the popular initiative “Against mass immigration”, the issue of party financing, the question of electronic voting, and the question of opening marriage to same-sex couples.

== See also ==
- Parliamentary Committees in Switzerland
- Council of States (Switzerland)
- National Council (Switzerland)
- Federal Assembly (Switzerland)
