= Human trafficking in Switzerland =

Switzerland ratified the 2000 UN TIP Protocol in October 2006.

In 2011 Switzerland was primarily a destination and, to a lesser extent, a transit country for women trafficked from Bulgaria, Slovakia, Slovenia, Ukraine, Moldova, Brazil, the Dominican Republic, Thailand, Cambodia, Nigeria, and Cameroon for the purpose of commercial sexual exploitation. Swiss authorities noted an increase in the number of women trafficked from Eastern Europe, specifically Romania, for sexual exploitation. Limited cases of trafficking for the purpose of domestic servitude and labor exploitation also were reported.

According to the U.S. Government's 2011 Trafficking in Persons report, Switzerland was rated in "Tier 2" for its efforts against human trafficking because it did fully comply with international minimum requirements but made "significant efforts to do so". However, the 2014 Trafficking in Persons report indicated that Switzerland was a "Tier 1" country, indicating that the government "fully complies with the minimum standards for the elimination of trafficking."

The U.S. State Department's Office to Monitor and Combat Trafficking in Persons placed the country in "Tier 1" in 2017. In 2023 it was at "Tier 2".

From 2019 to 2021, the government identified 295 victims of human trafficking; most were female and 8% of them were children.

In 2023, the Organised Crime Index noted that the country did not have a co-ordinated federal level plan to fight this crime.

== Prosecution (2008) ==
The Government of Switzerland demonstrated anti-trafficking law enforcement efforts during 2008. Switzerland prohibits both trafficking for sexual exploitation and trafficking for labor exploitation under the new Article 182 of the Swiss penal code, which prescribes penalties of up to 20 years' imprisonment and are commensurate with penalties prescribed for other grave crimes, such as rape. During the reporting period, authorities conducted at least 28 investigations, down from 39 in 2006. Authorities reported preliminary data of at least nine prosecutions in 2007, compared to 20 prosecutions reported in 2006. Courts reported convicting nine traffickers in 2007, compared to 20 reported convictions in 2006. Of those reported convicted, one trafficker was sentenced to 10 months' imprisonment and one trafficker was sentenced to 2.5 years' imprisonment; the remaining seven traffickers received suspended sentences or a fine and served no time in prison. In comparison, six of 20 trafficking offenders convicted in 2006 were reportedly given imposed sentences of between two and four years' imprisonment while 13 traffickers reportedly served no time, in prison. During the year, the Swiss Federal Office of Police reorganized and hired new staff to increase efforts to fight trafficking in persons.

== Protection (2008) ==
The government continued to improve its victim protection efforts during the 2008. In January 2008, a new Swiss federal law entered into force, formalizing a 30-day reflection period for victims of trafficking and authorizing the Swiss federal government to assist victims logistically and financially with repatriation to their countries of origin. In 2007, cantonal immigration authorities offered 33 trafficking victims 30-day reflection periods, compared to 39 victims in 2006. Six victims were offered short-term residency permits to stay in Switzerland for the duration of the legal proceedings against their traffickers, compared to three in 2006. Four victims were granted long-term residency permits on the grounds of personal hardship, compared to three in 2006. The Swiss government continued funding for NGOs to provide victim assistance services and shelter for victims. In 2006, the most recent year for which information was available, 80 victims received government-funded assistance compared to 126 victims reported from the previous year. In 2006, at least 65 victims assisted law enforcement by testifying against their traffickers. Ten out of 26 cantons have a formal procedure for victim identification and referral. Victims were not penalized for unlawful acts committed as a result of their being trafficked.

== Prevention (2008) ==
Switzerland continued its prevention efforts in 2007. The government again funded NGOs to carry out prevention campaigns in various countries including Cambodia, Mongolia, Burma, Moldova, Russia, and Lebanon. The Government of Switzerland provided anti-trafficking training to its troops being deployed abroad as international peacekeepers and maintained its zero-tolerance policy regarding any acts of sexual exploitation committed by these military personnel. Although the Swiss Border Guard monitored migration patterns for evidence of trafficking, authorities reported difficulty with identifying potential victims at border check-points. The government partially funded an NGO-run public awareness campaign targeting male clients of commercial sex leading up to the European Soccer Cup in Summer 2008. During the reporting period, one Swiss national was charged with traveling to Madagascar for the purpose of child sex tourism. In another case, Swiss authorities assisted Cambodian officials with the investigation of a Swiss national who was later convicted of child sexual exploitation in Cambodia and sentenced to 11 years' imprisonment.

== See also ==
- Crime in Switzerland
- Health in Switzerland
