= Criminal procedure =

Adjudication process in criminal law

Criminal procedure is the adjudication process of the criminal law. While criminal procedure differs dramatically by jurisdiction, the process generally begins with a formal criminal charge with the person on trial either being free on bail or incarcerated, and results in the conviction or acquittal of the defendant. Criminal procedure can be either in form of inquisitorial or adversarial criminal procedure.

== Basic rights ==
Currently, in many countries with a democratic system and the rule of law, criminal procedure puts the burden of proof on the prosecution – that is, it is up to the prosecution to prove that the defendant is guilty beyond any reasonable doubt, as opposed to having the defence prove that they are innocent, and any doubt is resolved in favor of the defendant. This provision, known as the presumption of innocence, is required, for example, in the 46 countries that are members of the Council of Europe, under Article 6 of the European Convention on Human Rights, and it is included in other human rights documents. However, in practice, it operates somewhat differently in different countries. These basic rights also include the right of the defendant to know the offence for which they have been arrested or charged, and the right to appear before a judicial official within a specified time after arrest. Many jurisdictions also allow the defendant the right to legal counsel and provide any defendant who cannot afford their own lawyer with a lawyer paid for at the public expense.

== Difference between criminal and civil cases ==
Countries using the common law tend to make a clear distinction between civil and criminal procedures. For example, an English criminal court may force a convicted accused to pay a fine to the Crown as punishment for the crime, and sometimes to pay the legal costs of the prosecution, but does not normally order the convicted accused to pay any compensation to the victim of the crime. The victim must pursue their claim for compensation in a civil, not a criminal, action. In countries using the continental civil law system, such as France and Italy, the victim of a crime (known as the "injured party") may be awarded damages by a criminal court judge.

The standards of proof are higher in a criminal action than in a civil one since the loser risks not only financial penalties but also being sent to prison (or, in some countries, execution). In English law, the prosecution must prove the guilt of a criminal "beyond reasonable doubt", while the plaintiff in a civil action is required to prove his case "on the balance of probabilities". "Beyond reasonable doubt" is not defined for the jury which decides the verdict, but it has been said by appeal courts that proving guilt beyond reasonable doubt requires the prosecution to exclude any reasonable hypothesis consistent with innocence: Plomp v. R. In a civil case, however, the court simply weighs the evidence and decides what is most probable.

Criminal and civil procedure are different. Although some systems, including the English, allow a private citizen to bring a criminal prosecution against another citizen, criminal actions are nearly always started by the state. Civil actions, on the other hand, are usually started by individuals.

In Anglo-American law, the party bringing a criminal action (that is, in most cases, the state) is called the prosecution, but the party bringing a civil action is the plaintiff. In a civil action the other party is known as the defendant. In a criminal case, the private party may be known as the defendant or the accused. A criminal case in the United States against a person named Ms. Sanchez would be entitled United States v. (short for versus, or against) Sanchez if initiated by the federal government; if brought by a state, the case would typically be called State v. Sanchez or People v. Sanchez. In the United Kingdom, the criminal case would be styled R. (short for Rex or Regina, that is, the King or Queen) v. Sanchez. In both the United States and the United Kingdom, a civil action between Ms. Sanchez and a Mr. Smith would be Sanchez v. Smith if started by Sanchez and Smith v. Sanchez if begun by Smith.

Evidence given at a criminal trial is not necessarily admissible in a civil action about the same matter, just as evidence given in a civil cause is not necessarily admissible on a criminal trial. For example, the victim of a road accident does not directly benefit if the driver who injured him is found guilty of the crime of careless driving. He still has to prove his case in a civil action. In fact he may be able to prove his civil case even when the driver is found not guilty in the criminal trial. If the accused has given evidence on his trial he may be cross-examined on those statements in a subsequent civil action regardless of the criminal verdict.

Once the plaintiff has shown that the defendant is liable, the main argument in a civil court is about the amount of money, or damages, which the defendant should pay to the plaintiff.

== Differences between civil law and common law systems ==
- The majority of civil law jurisdictions follow an inquisitorial system of adjudication, in which judges undertake an active investigation of claims by examining the evidence at the trial, while other judges contribute by preparing reports.
- In common law systems, the trial judge presides over proceedings grounded in the adversarial system of dispute resolution, where both the prosecution and the defence prepare arguments to be presented before the court. Some civil law systems have adopted adversarial procedures.

Proponents of each system tend to consider that theirs defends best the rights of the innocent. There is a tendency in common law countries to believe that civil law / inquisitorial systems do not have the so-called "presumption of innocence", and do not provide the defence with adequate rights. Conversely, there is a tendency in countries with an inquisitorial system to believe that accusatorial proceedings unduly favour rich defendants who can afford large legal teams, and therefore disadvantage poorer defendants.

== See also ==
- Offence (law)
- Trial (law)
- Civil procedure
- Code of Criminal Procedure, 1973 of India
- (United Kingdom) Criminal Procedure Act
- Criminal procedure in the United States
  - Court Appointed Special Advocates
- Formal procedure law in Switzerland
- (Italy) Italian Criminal Procedure
- Code of Criminal Procedure (Japan)
- Criminal Procedure Code (Malaysia)
- Criminal Procedure Code (Ukraine)
