= Crime in Switzerland =

- Homicide: 0.5 (2024)
- Assault: 9.9 (2023)
- Burglary: 516.4 (2024)
- Theft: 1975.0 (2024)
- Fraud: 414.1 (2024)
- Corruption: 0.4 (2024)
- Bribery: 0.4 (2024)
- Money laundering: 64.5 (2024)
- Rape: 9.5 (2023)
- Sexual violence: 33.7 (2023)
- reported per 100,000 inhabitants

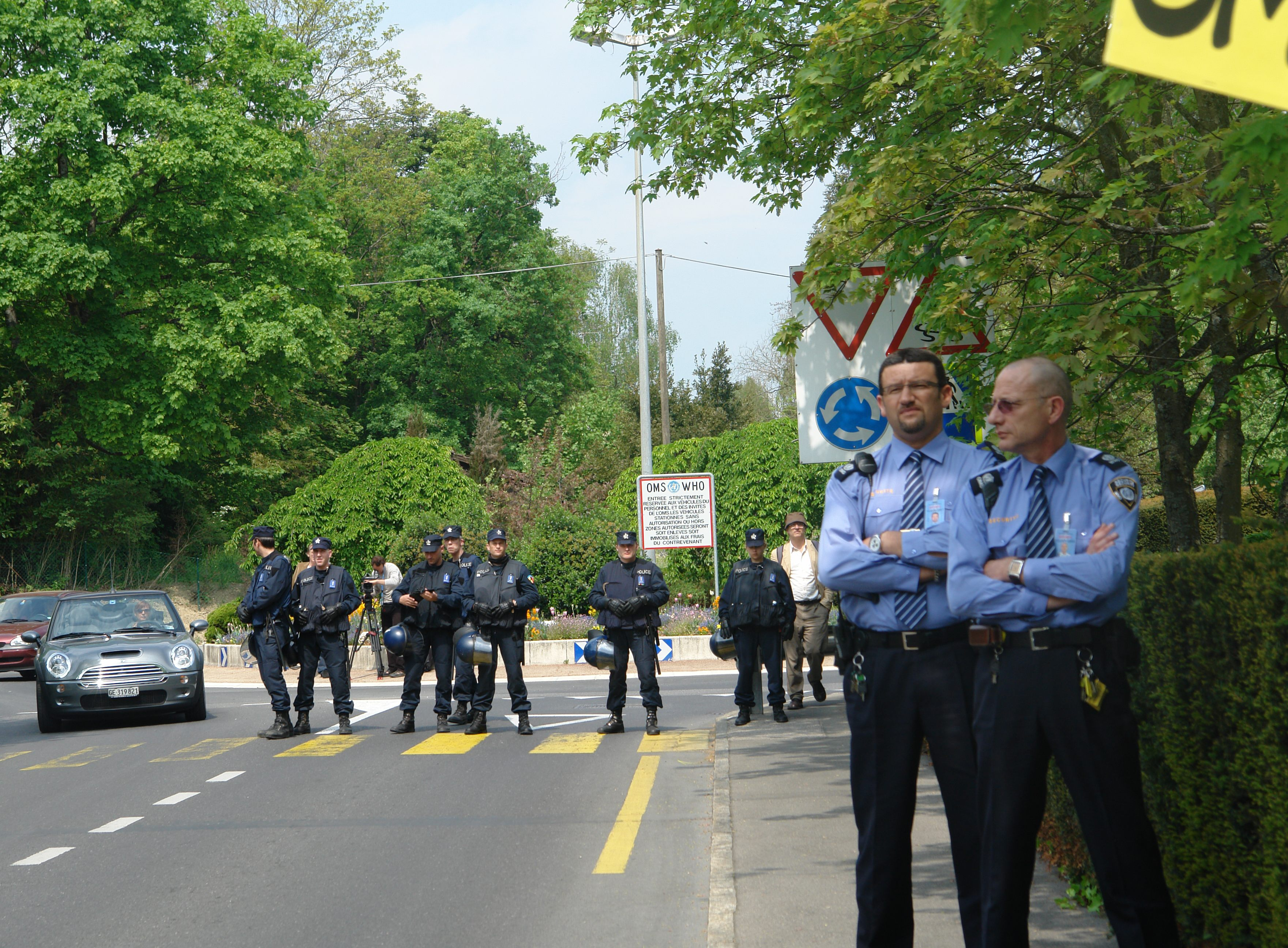
Swiss police and security officers on duty responding to demonstrations on Chernobyl day near the WHO summit in Geneva on 26 April 2007

Crime in Switzerland is combated mainly by cantonal police. The Federal Office of Police investigates organised crime, money laundering and terrorism.

== Crime statistics ==
Switzerland maintains a relatively low crime rate compared to other countries. However challenges remain, particularly in drug trafficking, organized crime, money laundering and specific violent offenses.

In Switzerland, police registered a total of 432,000 offenses under the Criminal Code in 2019 (−0.2% compared with previous year), of which 110,140 or 25.5 percent were cases of thefts (excluding vehicles, −2.0%), and 41,944 or 9.7 percent were thefts of vehicles (including bicycles, −10.1%), 46 were killings and 161 were attempted murders. The number of cases of rape reported increased by 53 incidents or 8.5 percent over the previous year. The number of criminal pornography offenses increased by 56.1 percent to 2,837. Offenses against the Narcotics Act decreased by 0.7 percent to 75,757.

In 2014, 110,124 adults were convicted, of which 55,240 (50%) were convicted according to traffic regulation offences, 6,540 (+1.6%) for trafficking in narcotic substances, and 17,882 (−7.2%) for offenses against the Federal Act on Foreign Nationals. 83,014 or 83.4% of adult convicted people are male, and 42,289 or 42.5 percent of them Swiss citizens. In the same year, 11,484 minors (78 percent of them male, 68 percent of them of Swiss nationality, 64.2 percent aged either 16 or 17) were convicted.

Convictions for infliction of bodily harm have steadily increased throughout the 1990s and 2000s, with 23 convictions for serious injury and 831 for light injury in 1990 as opposed to 78 and 2,342, respectively, in 2005. Convictions for rape have also slightly increased, fluctuating between 500 and 600 cases per year in the period 1985 to 1995, but between 600 and 700 cases in the period 2000 to 2005. Consistent with these trends, convictions for threats or violence directed against officials has consistently risen in the same period, from 348 in 1990 to 891 in 2003.

83.1% of the population feel “fairly or very safe after dark in their neighbourhood” according to a 2026-survey.

=== Types of convictions ===
The number of convicted persons is given in the following tables. Each class of crime references the relevant section of the Strafgesetzbuch (Criminal Code, abbreviated as StGB in German), or Betäubungsmittelgesetz (abbr. BetmG, Narcotics Act), or the Strassenverkehrsgesetz (abbr. SVG, Swiss Traffic Regulations).

Year	Total convicted adults (StGB only)	Homicide (Art. 111,112,113,116 StGB)	Serious bodily injury (Art. 122 StGB)	Minor bodily injury (Art. 123 StGB)	Sexual contact with children (Art. 187 StGB)	Rape (Art. 190 StGB)	Theft (Art. 139 StGB)	Robbery (Art. 140 StGB)	Receiving stolen goods (Art. 160 StGB)	Embezzlement (Art. 138 StGB)	Fraud (Art. 146 StGB)	Narcotics possession	Major violation of traffic laws (Art. 90 Abs. 1&2 SVG)	Impaired driving (Art. 91 SVG)
2005	26,200	106	95	2,438	416	110	5,968	498	1,249	907	1,468	5,508	22,013	16,466
2006	26,428	116	108	2,553	389	134	5,892	574	1,184	863	1,512	5,419	21,725	20,900
2007	24,184	104	93	2,283	387	136	5,505	532	943	805	1,587	5,073	21,431	20,083
2008	26,025	102	134	2,622	408	133	5,732	537	914	840	1,641	5,349	25,184	20,376
2009	27,497	100	130	2,665	384	131	6,393	553	943	847	1,555	5,491	25,472	19,483
2010	28,603	96	152	2,690	331	134	6,669	611	911	783	1,746	6,104	25,960	20,421
2011	29,645	84	137	2,775	276	87	7,074	464	1,033	726	1,831	4,851	24,040	19,127
2012	34,270	117	188	2,902	298	110	9,026	534	1,347	756	1,994	5,795	23,248	18,662
2013	35,726	121	187	2,892	322	99	9,577	683	1,440	676	2,332	6,119	22,584	17,625
2014	34,335	123	235	2,768	318	109	8,557	584	1,154	694	2,253	6,384	24,838	17,327
2015	32,992	115	239	2,581	350	104	7,491	528	946	693	2,434	6,746	23,881	16,728
2016^{a}	32,378	91	206	2,471	294	86	7,028	408	804	693	2,294	6,354	22,473	16,720

^a 2016 conviction numbers may not include convictions overturned on appeal.
Due to privacy protection laws some convictions are not included.

Year	Total convicted minors (StGB only)	Homicide (Art. 111,112,113,116 StGB)	Serious bodily injury (Art. 122 StGB)	Minor bodily injury (Art. 123 StGB)	Sexual contact with children (Art. 187 StGB)	Rape (Art. 190 StGB)	Theft (Art. 139 StGB)	Robbery (Art. 140 StGB)	Receiving stolen goods (Art. 160 StGB)	Embezzlement (Art. 138 StGB)	Fraud (Art. 146 StGB)	Narcotics possession	Major violation of traffic laws (Art. 90 Abs. 1&2 SVG)	Impaired driving (Art. 91 SVG)
2005	7,580	7	10	634	73	14	3,528	375	400	34	65	918	124	180
2006	7,768	7	22	644	118	19	3,417	330	390	35	51	1,019	125	188
2007	6,912	7	21	701	102	20	2,190	285	285	21	47	680	117	141
2008	6,976	4	24	688	80	17	1,999	334	272	17	57	560	101	125
2009	6,930	7	24	664	73	5	2,031	366	315	19	57	600	142	105
2010	7,614	13	36	770	71	17	2,411	413	242	19	51	566	120	141
2011	5,428	2	31	551	65	5	1,589	259	155	10	49	507	138	152
2012	5,073	2	34	476	69	8	1,624	305	165	25	56	555	74	124
2013	5,193	4	31	408	75	22	1,664	324	171	26	90	691	72	95
2014	4,912	3	33	393	66	9	1,388	240	162	25	70	832	91	126
2015	4,518	4	28	342	89	5	1,387	196	146	17	73	972	127	105
2016^{a}	4,613	6	47	342	69	11	1,415	161	151	15	93	879	86	111

^a 2016 conviction numbers may not include convictions overturned on appeal.
Due to privacy protection laws some convictions are not included.

=== Historic conviction rates ===
The historic adult conviction rates are given in the following chart:

Year	Total Adult Convictions	Criminal Convictions			Narcotics Convictions			Traffic Convictions		
Year	Total Adult Convictions	Total	Male	Swiss	Total	Male	Swiss	Total	Male	Swiss
1985	46,252	20,272	81.1%	66.8%	3,855	81.3%	69.9%	22,125	89.6%	74.5%
1990	52,030	19,810	80.2%	57.1%	4,176	81.8%	61.4%	28,044	88.5%	67.2%
1995	57,478	17,824	83.3%	55.0%	5,442	84.1%	53.7%	34,212	86.5%	63.3%
2000	68,654	20,614	85.2%	49.5%	6,798	70.7%	34.6%	41,242	85.0%	60.3%
2005	80,484	26,199	84.7%	49.7%	6,847	71.6%	33.3%	47,438	84.0%	55.5%
2006	85,477	26,583	84.8%	50.2%	6,792	70.1%	34.7%	52,102	83.7%	54.8%
2007	80,299	24,265	85.0%	51.3%	6,051	74.4%	35.3%	49,983	84.4%	53.9%
2008	88,147	26,327	84.5%	51.0%	6,240	77.2%	36.8%	55,580	83.5%	52.6%
2009	89,542	27,727	84.7%	48.5%	6,430	76.8%	34.8%	55,385	83.3%	52.4%
2010	93,187	28,691	84.0%	47.4%	7,006	78.7%	33.7%	57,490	83.0%	51.6%
2011	87,222	29,128	83.5%	44.9%	5,401	78.2%	32.6%	52,693	83.3%	50.6%
2012	95,702	33,925	83.8%	41.5%	6,562	80.0%	30.6%	55,215	82.0%	50.3%
2013	97,706	35,325	83.3%	40.3%	7,141	77.5%	28.9%	55,240	81.6%	48.8%
2014^{a}	98,582	32,911	82.6%	41.3%	7,392	76.2%	30.4%	58,279	80.4%	48.1%

^a 2014 conviction numbers may not include convictions overturned on appeal.

=== Age at conviction ===
The age of the individuals at the time of their convictions is given in this chart:

Year	18–19	20–24	25–29	30–34	35–39	40–44	45–49	50–59	60–69	70+
1985	7.9%	26.8%	18.6%	13.6%	10.4%	7.7%	5.4%	6.4%	2.5%	0.7%
1990	6.6%	26.4%	20.7%	14.5%	9.9%	7.5%	5.4%	6.1%	2.2%	0.7%
1995	5.4%	21.4%	20.8%	15.5%	11.5%	8.6%	6.5%	7.1%	2.5%	0.8%
2000	6.5%	19.3%	17.1%	15.5%	12.5%	9.7%	7.2%	8.3%	3.1%	0.9%
2005	7.2%	20.7%	15.4%	13.5%	12.4%	10.5%	7.4%	8.8%	3.1%	1.0%
2006	7.4%	20.6%	15.0%	12.6%	12.0%	10.7%	7.9%	9.2%	3.6%	1.0%
2007	7.5%	20.5%	15.0%	12.2%	12.1%	10.6%	7.9%	9.6%	3.5%	1.2%
2008	6.9%	20.7%	15.3%	12.2%	11.5%	10.1%	8.2%	9.7%	3.9%	1.4%
2009	7.2%	21.0%	15.9%	12.4%	11.2%	10.1%	8.1%	9.0%	3.8%	1.4%
2010	7.1%	20.7%	16.1%	12.3%	11.1%	10.2%	8.0%	9.5%	3.7%	1.4%
2011	6.5%	20.8%	16.8%	12.7%	11.0%	9.5%	7.9%	9.2%	4.0%	1.4%
2012	6.2%	19.9%	17.0%	13.7%	10.7%	9.5%	7.8%	9.3%	4.2%	1.7%
2013	5.9%	18.8%	17.3%	13.9%	11.0%	9.6%	8.2%	9.8%	3.9%	1.6%
2014^{a}	5.4%	17.7%	16.6%	14.2%	11.4%	9.6%	8.6%	10.4%	4.4%	1.8%

^a 2014 conviction numbers may not include convictions overturned on appeal.

=== Juvenile crimes ===
According to official statistics, there has been a total of 20,902 juvenile convictions in 2021 – 7.5 percent more than in 2020. According to a 2021 survey about juvenile crimes, 6.4 percent of respondents aged 14 and 15 admitted participating in a group fight. Shoplifting was the most common offence with 15 percent. Another 10.3 percent carried firearms, batons, large knives or other weapons. Acts of vandalism were committed by 9.4 percent. Five and a half percent trafficked or assisted in trafficking drugs. Burglary was admitted by 1.5 percent, 1.1 percent to vehicle theft. Five percent committed hate crimes; 2.9 percent sent unsolicited or unauthorised intimate pictures. Online fraud and hacking were each admitted by 2.7 percent. Assaults inflicting serious injuries were committed by 2.6 percent. Robbing others with a weapon, violence or serious threat was reported by 1.3 percent.

== Incarceration ==
In 2017, 6,863 people were incarcerated in Swiss prisons or pre-trial detention facilities, of which 49.3 percent were legal residents, 9.6 percent were asylum seekers and 41.1 percent were classified "other foreigners" (which includes cross-border workers, undocumented migrants, tourists, and foreigners with no fixed abode in Switzerland). Of the 6,863, 1,673 were undergoing rehabilitation; of these, 49 percent were foreigners with no fixed residence in Switzerland.

== Crime by type ==
Suspected cases of embezzlement, tax fraud, money laundering and sexual harassment have been reported in 35 percent of companies in Switzerland. Under Swiss laws, a company can be held criminally liable for inadequate organisation or failing to take all reasonable measures to prevent a crime from happening.

=== Money laundering ===
Swiss banks have served as safe havens for the wealth of dictators, despots, mobsters, arms dealers, corrupt officials, and tax cheats of all kinds.

Money laundering is a criminal offence punishable by the criminal authorities (Art. 305bis of the Swiss Criminal Code). According to the Money Laundering Reporting Office Switzerland (MLROS) in 2017, official "suspicious activity reports" reached nearly 4,700 (worth $16.2 billion) up from 2,909 reported cases in 2016. Suspicious activity reports increased to 21,000 in 2025.

The Money Laundering Reporting Office is a federal body responsible for receiving and analysing suspicious activity reports in connection with money laundering, terrorist financing, and money of criminal origin, and forwarding them to the law enforcement agencies if necessary. As of 2025, MLROS has 55 investigators dedicated to the task of reviewing these reports.

In 1989, the Swiss justice minister had to step down, following allegation of money laundering by her husband. This was the largest case of drug-related money laundering to become public.

According to FINMA in 2023, 50 percent of Swiss banks had “largely unsatisfactory” anti-money laundering systems.

==== Loopholes ====
Swiss banks have a legal obligation to record the ultimate beneficial owners of all assets they handle worldwide, but doing so accurately can be tricky in jurisdictions where it is easy for third parties to mask who the owners are. Thus, loopholes exist through the use of shell companies, trust funds, and proxy directors signing the paperwork without owning the assets.

Under current rules, banking institutions and cantonal authorities can only report what's in their registers – looking into the origins of assets or connections between individuals is not permitted (2022). The authorities can access beneficial owner's data only when an investigation has been opened.

SFAO (Swiss Federal Audit Office) points to loopholes in the commodities sector, particularly the purchase of materials for smelting, which is partially excluded from the monitoring of raw materials origins. Control is limited to verification of the trade in already refined gold bars.

===== Sanctioned countries =====
A provision in Swiss law allows its companies' overseas subsidiaries (e.g. in Dubai, Cyprus or Hong Kong) to trade commodities for sanctioned countries (like Russia for example) as long as they are "legally independent". Besides, Swiss sanctions law does not apply to its nationals living abroad. The Office of the Attorney General says it can only open an investigation into alleged violations of sanctions if asked by the SECO. When it comes to sanctions, Switzerland doesn't have a dedicated agency and relies instead on multiple federal agencies, the cantons and the banks for reporting any violations.

In 2026, UBS was charged for repeatedly laundering money through one of its US subsidiaries and fined $125 million by FinCEN.

==== Criticism ====
Suspicious activities' real numbers are said to be much higher than those officially reported. Besides, the government rarely follows up on these reports because of lack of means, incentives and a clear legal framework.

According to the Swiss Federal Audit Office (SFAO) the law, as it is currently written, has no dissuasive effect, since companies pay a maximum amount of CHF5 million ($5.2 million), if convicted.

Supervisory body FINMA can warn banks of the risks they are taking following "suspicious activity reports", but the decision to accept a customer is ultimately up to the bank, with banks fearing to lose their customers to foreign or domestic competitors in some cases.

In February 2022, the European People's Party of the European Parliament proposed reviewing Swiss banking practices and money laundering status in response to the Suisse Secrets leaks, asking the European Commission to reclassify Switzerland as a high-risk country for financial crime.

According to SFAO, the real estate sector in Switzerland is still an attractive place to introduce funds of illegal origin into the legal financial circuit.

According to the Basel Institute on Governance in 2022, Switzerland ranks 95th out of 129 countries when it comes to money laundering and corruption risks.

In 2022, financier Bill Browder criticized Switzerland for being "the money-laundering capital of the world".

==== Reforms ====
As of 2023, financial intermediaries are required to verify the identity of customers, record which services have been provided to them, and clarify their background and purpose. Swiss-based charities must appoint a representative in Switzerland and keep a list of their members for five years. The new rules also oblige banks to inform the Money Laundering Reporting Office Switzerland (MLROS) of criminal funds, which they did not always disclose.

Swiss NGO Public Eye has recommended the creation of a supervisory authority for the commodities sector to improve the tracking of the actual owners of trading firms and ensure that commodities don't originate in conflict zones or countries subject to international sanctions. As of 2023, Swiss companies using blockchain technology for the tracing of commodities such as gold or diamonds (from mining to commercialization) are slowly emerging.

In addition, FATF and Transparency International are demanding that lawyers, financial advisors plus real estate and art transactions be subject to the same exacting anti-money laundering measures as banks. The Swiss parliament has pushed back on some of these reforms on grounds of "competitiveness" for the banking sector.

==== Terrorism financing ====
Regulation of money laundering in Switzerland includes the Federal Act on Combating Money Laundering and Terrorist Financing (Anti-Money Laundering Act, AMLA) which requires financial intermediaries such as investment banks or insurance companies to comply with due diligence and disclosure requirements.

According to the Swiss Federal Prosecutor's office and media, in the 1990s and early 2000s Al Qaeda members had accounts at Swiss banks, including UBS.

==== Assets seizure ====
Swiss authorities can freeze assets if the law requires them to. However, seizing assets is only permitted in cases involving crime or for destituted potentates.

According to Article 72 of the Swiss criminal code, "all assets that are subject to the power of disposal of a criminal or terrorist organisation" can be permanently confiscated. "In the case of assets belonging to a person who participates in or supports such an organisation (Art. 260), it is presumed that the assets are subject to the power of disposal of the organisation until the contrary is proven." According to experts, the forfeiture rule "does not violate the property guarantee".

=== Drugs ===
As of 2017 drug use was the most common reason why people aged 10–18 were reported by police (being filed, being fined, or reported to justice), however dealing has been diminished since 2010.

According to Addiction Switzerland, "Illegal substances can be found in cities quickly and relatively easily".

Cannabis use among adolescents and young adults in Switzerland has increased significantly within ten years. In 2017, nine percent of adolescents and young adults aged 15–24 reported having used cannabis in the past month. The figures are much higher in the 20–24 age bracket, with 14 percent of men and 6.5 percent of women saying they had consumed cannabis in the past 30 days.

According to a recent study, 5 Swiss cities (St Gallen, Bern, Zurich, Basel and Geneva) were listed among the top 10 European cities for cocaine use.

Swiss authorities, including CHUV, estimate that dealers and traffickers make profits of $28.1-29.1 million a year in Vaud alone.

Analysis of Swiss police records suggests that participants in medical drug rehabilitation programs tend to reduce cocaine, cannabis and heroin use, and the need to commit other crimes to buy their drugs, such as shoplifting, burglary or car theft.

In 2022, a near all-time record Brazilian shipment of 500 kg of cocaine was intercepted by the Swiss authorities at a Nespresso factory in Fribourg. In 2023, the probe was "paused" in Switzerland, allegedly for failure to identify the perpetrators.

According to a 2023 study, between ten and fifteen percent of the people who drive a vehicle in Switzerland are under the influence of dangerous substances (including cocaine).

Basel and its ports on the Rhine are said to be one of the main access points for the cocaine arriving in Europe.

=== Theft ===
19 cars are stolen in Switzerland every day (2021). Forty thousand bikes are stolen each year (2022). Some eight thousand people have been arrested for theft in Switzerland in 2025. The vast majority (80%) of whom are foreigners according to statistics.

=== Burglary ===
According to official statistics, Swiss police recorded 35,732 burglaries in 2022, which is a 14.6% rise compared to 2021.

=== Homicide ===
In 2019, there were 161 attempted and 46 completed homicides, for a homicide rate of 0.54 per 100,000 population, one of the lowest rates in the world. Of the 207 cases, 105 were committed with bladed weapons, twenty with firearms and 47 unarmed. Out of 229 identified suspects; 197 were male, 126 (55%) were foreigners of which 72 had permanent residence. Twenty-nine cases (63%) of completed and 50 cases (31%) of attempted homicide were classed as domestic violence.

=== Mass shootings ===
Semi-automatic rifles are banned. However sports shooters and collectors can still purchase them with a special permit. The regulations of the Swiss militia system stipulate that the soldiers keep their own personal equipment, including all personally assigned weapons, at home or in an armoury; until 2007 this also included ammunition.

Notable Mass shootings in Switzerland in recent years (not an exhaustive list).
Date	Location	Dead	Injured	Description
27 September 2001	Zug	14	18	a man entered the Parliament of the Canton of Zug and shot thirty-two people, killing fourteen.
2 January 2013	Daillon (VS)	3	2	
27 February 2013	Menznau (LU)	4	5	a man opened fire at his workplace, killing four people and wounding five before dying of a self-inflicted gunshot wound.
19 December 2016	Zürich (canton)	2	3	a gunman killed one person and wounded three people at an Islamic center before killing himself.
30 August 2026	Aarau	1	5	the suspected perpetrator, a 43-year-old Swiss man, was arrested. He is considered to be a lone perpetrator.

=== Cybercriminality ===
In 2016, 14,033 cybercrime cases were reported to police in Switzerland, compared to 11,575 in 2015 and 5,330 in 2011. Swiss media reported that over three million Swiss email usernames and associated passwords are available on the net since 2019. These include login details of government ministers, government employees and the military.

In 2019, computer-related infractions include the fraudulent misuse of a computer (5,583 cases in 2019, a rise of 598 relative to 2018) and pornography-related offenses (2,387 cases, a jump of over 50 percent).

In total, some 30,351 crimes were reported in the virtual space in 2021 (with online sales of “non-existent goods” being the most common crime).

In 2023, the Swiss government was the target of a major cyber-attack which purportedly stole very sensitive data that could endanger its national security and which was later available for sale on the dark web.

In 2026, hackers reportedly stole data related to more than 100,000 federal employees, including soldiers, spies and Swiss Federal Council ex-members.

=== Sex crimes ===
The Swiss legal definition of rape is "an assault during vaginal sexual intercourse with a woman", thus exempting men from the status of rape victims. Rape is punished by a prison sentence of one to ten years. Indecent assault, which includes "sexual acts similar to intercourse or any sexual act" (kissing, groping), is punished by a monetary fine for lighter crimes or a prison sentence of up to ten years. The sex of the victim is not specified. The Swiss police recorded 867 rape offences in 2022. According to the Wall Street Journal, Registered U.S. sex offender Jeffrey Epstein had many business relations with Swiss banks; in particular, Edmond de Rothschild Group.

==== Pedocriminality ====
In 2018 alone, the FBI reported 9,000 cases of child pornography and pedo-criminality originating in Switzerland, to the Swiss authorities (FedPol). It is unclear what the Swiss police does with this list. Other reports have been compiled in recent years by private organizations on this subject, including regarding a Tier Club ("Animal circle") and at the Swiss Television.

Cases of sexual abuse reported in the Catholic Church rose from 9 cases in 2012 to 65 in 2017 (63 percent of victims were 16 or younger and 27 percent were 12 or younger). But a study conducted by the University of Zurich in 2023 revealed that 1,000 cases of sexual abuse in the Swiss Catholic Church have occurred since 1950 referencing 510 offenders and 921 victims. The study says it might be "the tip of the iceberg" only.

In 2025, based on IP addresses, pictures or phone numbers, the US National Center for Missing and Exploited Children, transferred some 16,700 files to the Swiss authorities regarding pedocriminality. FedPol says it then transmits this information to the Cantons for enforcement if warranted.

=== Hate crimes ===
In Switzerland public discrimination or invoking to rancor against persons or a group of people because of their race, ethnicity, is penalized with a term of imprisonment of up to 3 years or a fine. In 1934, the authorities of the Canton of Basel-Stadt criminalized anti-Jewish hate speech, e.g., the accusation of ritual murders, mostly in reaction against a pro-Nazi antisemitic group and newspaper, the Volksbund.

In 2019, over 350 racist incidents were reported to the authorities. These cases relate to xenophobia (145 cases), anti-Black discrimination (132 cases) and anti-Muslim discrimination (55 cases), which is a "small percentage" of the overall racist incidents in Switzerland according to the authorities.

In 2020, xenophobia was found to be the most frequent motive (304 cases) for discrimination, followed by discrimination against black people (206 cases) and Muslims (55 cases). In 2021, 41 cases of anti-Asian racism were reported for the first time. There were also 92 reports of anti-LGBT hate crimes in 2021.

As of 2023, three out of 100 Swiss have experienced a hate crime. According to the same study, in 40.1% of the cases, the assault was based on origin, followed by assaults based on gender and appearance and with insults being the most common offense.

=== Corruption ===
Council of Europe's Group of State Against Corruption (GRECO) in its evaluation report noted that specificities of Switzerland's institutions which enjoy considerable public confidence. It underlines, however, that the very organisation of the system allows subtle pressure to be exerted on politicians and the judiciary.

Transparency International's 2017 Corruption Perception Index ranks Switzerland as the 5th least corrupt state out of 180 countries.

In 2018 the Tax Justice Network ranked Switzerland's banking sector as the "most corrupt" in the world due to a large offshore banking industry and very strict secrecy laws. The ranking attempts to measure how much assistance the country's legal systems provide to money laundering, and to protecting corruptly obtained wealth. The Helsinki Commission of the US Congress has strongly criticized the functioning of the Swiss judiciary and courts in 2023; namely by saying they are "corrupt".

After the 2026 Crans-Montana bar fire, local business owners accused municipal authorities of failing in its responsibility to enforce local fire safety regulations. They alleged that businesses in good standing with authorities were seldom if ever inspected, which they considered "[mafia-like".

In 2026, Pierre Mirabaud, the ex-head of the Swiss Bankers Association, was convicted of corruption, bribing public officials and money laundering and was given a two-year suspended jail sentence by the Swiss authorities.

=== White collar crime ===
In 2020, Swiss courts dealt with 52 major cases of economic crime that amounted to CHF355 million ($384 million) in losses. Most cases related to social security and insurance fraud.

== Crime dynamics ==
=== Immigrant criminality ===
The crime rate among resident foreigners ("immigrant criminality") is significantly higher (by a factor 3.7 counting convictions under criminal law in 2003). In 1997, there were for the first time more foreigners than Swiss among the convicts under criminal law (out of a fraction of 20.6 percent of the total population at the time). In 1999, the Federal Department of Justice and Police ordered a study regarding delinquency and nationality (Arbeitsgruppe "Ausländerkriminalität"), which in its final report (2001) found that a conviction rate under criminal law about 12 times higher among asylum seekers (four percent), while the conviction rate among other resident foreigners was about twice as high (0.6%) compared to Swiss citizens (0.3%).

Individuals convicted of violations of the Strafgesetzbuch (StGB)
Year	Total persons convicted	Total adults convicted	Swiss adults convicted	Total non-citizen adults convicted	Percentage of non-citizen adult convictions	B, C and Ci visa holders convicted	Other immigration status	Unknown immigration status
1999	27,493	21,101	10,314	10,787	51.1%	^{a}	^{a}	^{a}
2000	26,692	20,609	10,201	10,408	50.5%	^{a}	^{a}	^{a}
2001	26,804	20,052	10,233	9,819	49.0%	^{a}	^{a}	^{a}
2002	27,930	20,925	10,307	10,618	50.7%	^{a}	^{a}	^{a}
2003	30,068	22,966	11,115	11,851	51.6%	^{a}	^{a}	^{a}
2004	33,167	25,559	12,357	13,202	51.7%	^{a}	^{a}	^{a}
2005	33,778	26,198	13,025	13,173	50.3%	^{a}	^{a}	^{a}
2006	34,350	26,582	13,347	13,235	49.8%	^{a}	^{a}	^{a}
2007	31,189	24,280	12,455	11,825	48.7%	^{a}	^{a}	^{a}
2008	33,326	26,350	13,433	12,917	49.0%	6,746	4,619	1,552
2009	34,683	27,752	13,452	14,300	51.5%	7,397	5,410	1,493
2010	36,318	28,702	13,612	15,090	52.6%	7,377	6,228	1,485
2011	34,591	29,162	13,108	16,054	55.1%	7,317	7,366	1,371
2012	39,043	33,969	14,095	19,874	58.5%	7,989	9,922	1,963
2013	40,726	35,528	14,309	21,219	59.7%	8,345	10,568	2,306
2014	38,906	33,995	14,052	19,943	58.7%	8,577	9,362	2,004
2015 ^{b}	36,017	31,560	13,423	18,137	57.5%	8,151	8,305	1,681

^a Specific immigration status not collected
^b Final number may change due to appeals and trials still in progress

In 2010 for the first time was a statistic published which listed delinquency by nationality (based on 2009 data). To avoid distortions due to demographic structure, only the male population aged between 18 and 34 was considered for each group. From this study it became clear that crime rate is highly correlated on the country of origin of the various migrant groups. Thus, immigrants from Germany, France and Austria had a significantly lower crime rate than Swiss citizens (60% to 80%), while immigrants from Angola, Nigeria and Algeria had a crime rate of above 600 percent of that of Swiss population. In between these extremes were immigrants from former Yugoslavia, with crime rates of between 210 and 300 percent of the Swiss value.

The full report listed 24 nationalities plus the crime rate of Swiss citizens (fixed at 100 percent), and the average value of all foreign citizens combined, at 160 percent. Commentators expressed surprise at the clear geographical structure of the list, giving, in decreasing order, Africa, the Middle East and the Balkans, Southern Europe and Western and Central Europe. The Federal Statistics Office published the study with the caveat that the sizes of the groups under comparison vary considerably. For example, the net impact of a crime rate increased by 530 percent among 500 Angolans will still be five times smaller than a crime rate increased by thirty percent among 46,000 Portuguese. The country is a target for foreign criminals on account of its reputation as an affluent nation.

Rank	Country of origin	Crime rate (relative value)	Registered population (thousands)	Male young adults (thousands)
1	Angola	6.3	4.4	0.54
2	Nigeria	6.2	2.9	1.5
3	Algeria	6.0	4.1	1.2
4	Côte d'Ivoire	5.9	1.7	0.44
5	Dominican Republic	5.8	5.9	1.0
6	Sri Lanka	4.7	31	4.4
7	Congo (Kinshasa)	4.7	5.8	0.78
8	Cameroon	4.4	4.3	0.97
9	Morocco	4.3	7.4	1.6
10	Tunisia	4.2	6.3	2.1
11	Iraq	3.7	8.0	2.9
12	Colombia	3.2	4.2	0.71
13	Turkey	3.2	73	16
14	the former Serbia and Montenegro (includes Kosovo)	3.1	188	36
15	Brazil	3.0	17	2.5
16	Egypt	2.7	2.1	0.81
17	Croatia	2.4	35	5.0
18	Bosnia and Herzegovina	2.3	37	6.2
19	North Macedonia	2.3	60	12
	total foreign national population	1.6	1,714	330
20	Portugal	1.3	213	46
21	Italy	1.2	294	49
22	Switzerland	1.0	6,072	710
23	Austria	0.8	38	5.8
24	France	0.7	95	21
25	Germany	0.6	266	62

On 28 November 2010, fifty-three percent of voters approved a new, tougher deportation law. This law, proposed by the Swiss People's Party, called for the automatic expulsion of non-Swiss offenders convicted of a number of crimes, including murder, breaking and entry and even welfare fraud. As the proposal makes deportation mandatory, it denies judges any judicial discretion over deportation. An alternative proposal, that included case by case reviews and integration measures, was rejected by 54 percent of voters.

== Organized crime ==
Swiss banks have served as safe havens for the wealth of dictators, despots, mobsters, arms dealers, corrupt officials, and tax cheats of all kinds.

In 2022, Swiss media reported that one of Switzerland's top prosecutors (Dick Marty) was the target of an assassination plot by the Serbian government and Serbian mafia.

According to the Swiss attorney general in 2022, one of Switzerland's "great weaknesses" is that his federal agency has no national overview to combat organized crime because of the federal structure of Switzerland and the relative independence of the cantons. Besides, FedPol says it needs at least 200 more investigators to do its job correctly.

In May 2023, OFAC imposed new sanctions on Swiss-based DuLac Capital Ltd and its Swiss director for Russia (Anselm Oskar Schmucki) allegedly for close ties to the Russian mafia and for facilitating financial transactions on their behalf via a global network of shell companies. The director of the company says it is only "guilt by association".

According to the director of FedPol in 2023, Switzerland is attractive to criminal networks in many areas as a hiding place, for drugs, arms, human trafficking, burglaries and ATM robberies.

According to FedPol in 2020, about 400 members of the Italian mafia live in Switzerland. Organized crime also reportedly uses restaurants, real estate or construction companies ownership as fronts. FedPol itself is reported to have been infiltrated by organized crime in recent years.

According to FedPol in 2025, the risk of infiltration of the Swiss political system by organized crime linked to narcotrafficking is "real".

Starting in 2026, FedPol will implement new measures to detect and stop organized crime, notably in the field of intelligence, money laundering and real estate investments.

=== Human trafficking ===
The number of victims of human trafficking in Switzerland allegedly increased by fifty percent between 2019 and 2021 from 142 to 207. About two-thirds of the victims were trafficked for sexual purposes, the rest for labour exploitation and criminal activities.

== See also ==
- Criminal record in Switzerland
- Law enforcement in Switzerland
- Swiss Criminal Code
- Gun laws in Switzerland
