= Repo Man =

Repo Man may refer to:

- Repo man, a repossession agent, a job that entails the retrieval of collateral or outstanding rented or leased objects

== Art, entertainment, and media ==
=== Films ===
- Repo Man (film), a 1984 American science fiction black comedy film by Alex Cox featuring Harry Dean Stanton and Emilio Estevez
- Repo! The Genetic Opera, a 2008 American gothic rock opera musical film by Darren Lynn Bousman
- Repo Men, a 2010 American-Canadian action film by Miguel Sapochnik featuring Jude Law and Forest Whitaker

=== Television ===
- "Repo Man" (X-Men episode), an episode from the X-Men animated series
- "Repo Man", an episode from the TV series Supernatural

=== Music ===
- "Repo Man" (soundtrack), soundtrack to the eponymous 1984 film Repo Man
  - "Repo Man", a song by Iggy Pop from this soundtrack album
- "Repo Man", a song from the 2010 album God Willin' & the Creek Don't Rise

== Other uses ==
- Repo Man (wrestler), a ring name used by American professional wrestler Barry Darsow (born 1959)

== See also ==
- Repo (disambiguation)
- Repo Chick, a 2009 American comedy film by Alex Cox
