= Heikki Repo =

Finnish politician (1871–1931)

Heikki Repo (26 April 1871, Parikkala - 30 July 1931) was a Finnish farmer, bank director and politician. He was a member of the Parliament of Finland, representing the Finnish Party from 1907 to 1908, from 1909 to 1911 and from 1916 to 1917 and the National Coalition Party in 1919.
