= Office of the Attorney General of Switzerland =

Swiss federal judicial office

The Office of the Attorney General of Switzerland, (German: Bundesanwaltschaft, French: Ministère public de la Confédération, Italian: Ministero pubblico della Confederazione, Romansh: Procura publica federale) is the Swiss federal investigative and public prosecuting body, in a country where the Swiss Federal Constitution otherwise devolves responsibilities to the cantons of Switzerland. The Office is responsible for prosecuting certain types of offenses directed against the federal state, as well as complex proceedings concerning international or economic crime. The department is under the responsibility of the federal Attorney General, who is elected by the Federal Assembly, along with two deputies.

== Types of offenses prosecuted ==
The Swiss Criminal Procedure Code lists the offenses prosecuted by the Office of the Attorney General. These include offenses against federal magistrates and officials, prohibited intelligence service activities, counterfeiting, offenses involving explosives, and violations of the federal law on war material.

Additionally, certain federal laws grant jurisdiction to the Federal Criminal Court.

== Attorneys General ==
Since the establishment of the Swiss Confederation in 1848, the Confederation has had an Attorney General. Originally appointed by the Federal Council, this magistrate has been elected by the Federal Assembly since 2011. The following individuals have held this position:

- 1851-1852: Paul Migy
- 1852-1856: Jakob Amiet
- 1889-1899: Jakob Albert Scherb
- 1899-1916: Otto Kronauer
- 1916-1948: Franz Stämpfli
- 1949-1955: Werner Lüthi
- 1955-1957: René Dubois (jurist)
- 1958-1967: Hans Fürst
- 1968-1974: Hans Walder
- 1974-1989: Rudolf Gerber (jurist)
- 1990-1993: Willy Padrutt
- 1994-1998: Carla Del Ponte
- 2000-2006: Valentin Roschacher
- 2006-2007: Michel-André Fels (interim postholder)
- 2007-2011: Erwin Beyeler
- 2012-2020: Michael Lauber
- Since 2021: Stefan Blättler

== Full-time positions since 2001 ==
Raw data

"Federal Finance Administration FFA: State financial statements".
"Federal Finance Administration FFA: Data portal".

== See also ==
- Crime in Switzerland
- Swiss Criminal Procedure Code
- Public prosecutor's office
- Attorney General

== Bibliography ==
- "Code de procédure pénale suisse" [Swiss Criminal Procedure Code]. Code de procédure pénale suisse (in French). 5 October 2007.
- "Loi fédérale sur l'organisation des autorités pénales de la Confédération" [Federal Act on the Organization of Federal Criminal Authorities]. Loi fédérale sur l'organisation des autorités pénales de la Confédération (in French). 19 March 2010.

=== External links ===
- Official website
