= Criminal record in Switzerland =

Swiss criminal record register

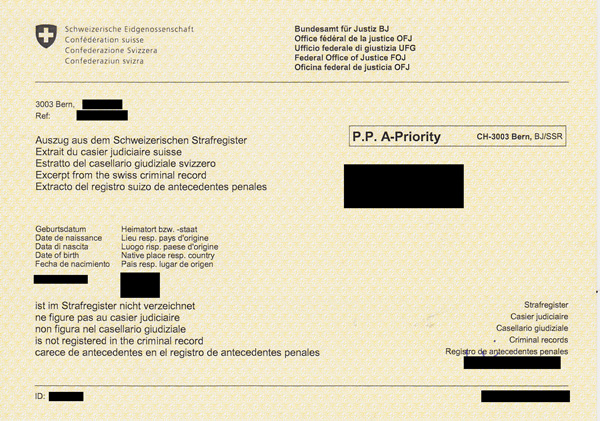
Extract from a Swiss criminal record

In the law of Switzerland, the criminal record is governed by the Swiss Penal Code.

== Purpose ==
The aim is, among other things, to ensure the conduct of criminal proceedings, the enforcement of sentences and measures, to verify the successful integration of individuals during the naturalization process, to collect statistics on criminal matters, and to exclude individuals from civil service or Swiss Armed Forces.

== Content ==
In terms of content, the criminal record includes, among other things, judgments for crimes or misdemeanors if a sentence has been imposed, judgments pronounced abroad if they are communicated to Switzerland, and facts that lead to a change in the entries in the criminal record. Fines of up to CHF 5,000 are not entered in the criminal record (if the offender is sentenced to a fine only; all other convictions, daily fines, or custodial sentences are entered in the record). In the case of minors, only convictions for crimes or offenses resulting in deprivation of liberty, placement in care, or outpatient treatment are entered in the criminal record.

=== Access ===
Access to data by public authorities may be authorized in whole or in part: for example, the Office of the Attorney General of Switzerland has access to all data except outpatient treatment (in the case of minors) and pending proceedings, while the Armed Forces Command has access only to any outpatient treatment penalties during the recruitment phase, when weapons are handed over, or during promotion within the armed forces. Nevertheless, even though the Armed Forces Command does not have access to all data, any conviction for a crime or offense must be communicated to it if the person is currently a member of the armed forces or a conscript.

=== Extract ===
Everyone can request an extract from their own criminal record (Section 371 of the Swiss Criminal Code). This can be done by mail or online with a valid ID. In addition, it is possible to use an electronic signature (SuisseID) online instead of sending a copy of the ID, which speeds up the process. The extract can be issued in paper form or as a protected, signed, and time-stamped PDF The fee is 20 CHF. The criminal record extract lists convictions for crimes and misdemeanors. Judgments for misdemeanors are only mentioned if a professional ban has been imposed (Sections 67 and 371 of the Swiss Criminal Code) or if the fine exceeds 5,000 Swiss francs (Section 3 of the VOSTRA Ordinance). In the event of a suspended sentence, the entry in the extract is removed at the end of the suspension period.

== Deletion ==
Entries are deleted within a period that varies depending on the type of conviction (sentence or measure) and its duration. Such periods depend on the type and duration of the sentence or measure. Custodial sentences of at least five years are deleted after 20 years, those between one and five years after 15 years, and finally, those of less than one year after 10 years.

== See also ==
=== Legal basis ===
- Arts. 365–371a, Swiss Criminal Code (RS 311.0)
- Criminal Record Ordinance (VOSTRA) (RS 311.1)

=== Related articles ===
- Swiss Criminal Code
