= Swiss Bankers Association =

Professional association

The Swiss Bankers Association is a professional organization of Swiss financial institutions.

== Background ==
The trade association known as the Swiss Bankers Association was founded in 1912 in Basel, Switzerland. It is the primary industry group representing the Swiss Banks to the government of Switzerland and to the governments of other states. The unity provided by this organization allows the various Swiss banks, from the "Big Two" (UBS and Credit Suisse) down to the smaller community and cantonal banks, to collaborate on various issues of importance to the banking community.

The Swiss Bankers Association's main goal is to maintain and promote the best possible framework conditions for the actors of the Swiss financial centre both at home and abroad.

Firstly, it represents all banks in Switzerland (also foreign owned banks established in Switzerland) in their dealings with authorities in Switzerland and abroad.

Secondly, it promotes the image of the Swiss financial centre throughout the world and fosters a dialogue with the public in Switzerland and abroad.

Thirdly, the banks engage in a form of self-regulation, in conjunction with the Swiss Financial Market Supervisory Authority (FINMA). Under this system, the banks draw up a code of conduct in partnership with the FINMA, which is then enforced through the oversight of the FINMA.

Fourthly, the banks maintain more security, both for their clients and for the world, by working together. They can more adequately protect clients identity, while they can also collaborate to aid the Swiss government in freezing the funds of criminals being investigated under the 1983 Federal Law relating to International Mutual Assistance in Criminal Matters.

Finally, the SBA coordinates and supports the professional training of junior staff and experienced professionals in the banking industry in order to maintain the high quality of customer services.

== Organization ==
The organization as of November 2021 has 300 institutional members (banking, securities, and auditing institutions) and approximately 12,000 individual members (high-ranking officials within the institutional members). The chief executive officer of the organization is Roman Studer, with Marcel Rohner as chairman of the board.

A questionnaire in 2014 among its members showed that 85% of the smaller and regional banks consider themselves either unrepresented or insufficiently represented by the SBV.

=== Controversy ===
In 2026, Pierre Mirabaud, the ex-head of the Swiss Bankers Association, was convicted of corruption, bribing public officials and money laundering and was given a two-year suspended sentence by the Swiss authorities.

== See also ==
- Banking in Switzerland
- List of Banks in Switzerland
