= Corruption in Switzerland =

Corruption in Switzerland describes the prevention and occurrence of corruption in Switzerland.

== Extent ==
=== Government ===
Switzerland has a legal framework to combat corruption and several authorities are in charge of curbing the levels of it, particularly when it comes to corruption within Swiss financial institutions. Several sources suggest that the country's fight against corruption has been effective. However, efforts to combat corruption, especially with respect to political party financing have been described as unsatisfactory.

The Council of Europe's Group of States Against Corruption (GRECO) noted in its 2017 evaluation the specific features of Switzerland's institutions which inspire public confidence in those institutions. The GRECO report also identified three problem areas: potential conflicts of interest in politicians, a potential lack of objectivity in federal judges, and a lack of transparency in the internal operations of the Office of the Attorney General. Finally, GRECO recommended that formal codes of conduct be adopted in these three areas.

On Transparency International's 2025 Corruption Perceptions Index, Switzerland scored 80 on a scale from 0 ("highly corrupt") to 100 ("very clean"). Although a very good score, this is Switzerland's lowest score since the current scoring system was implemented in 2012. When ranked by score, Switzerland ranked 6th among the 182 countries in the Index, where the country ranked first is perceived to have the most honest public sector. For comparison with regional scores, the best score among Western European and European Union countries (Note: Austria, Belgium, Bulgaria, Croatia, Cyprus, Czechia, Denmark, Estonia, Finland, France, Germany, Greece, Hungary, Iceland, Ireland, Italy, Latvia, Lithuania, Luxembourg, Malta, Netherlands, Norway, Poland, Portugal, Romania, Slovakia, Slovenia, Spain, Sweden, Switzerland, and the United Kingdom.) was 89, the average score was 64 and the worst score was 40. For comparison with worldwide scores, the best score was 89 (ranked 1), the average score was 42, and the worst score was 9 (ranked 181, in a two-way tie).

The Transparency International Global Barometer 2013 showed that political parties were considered the most corrupt institution in Switzerland. On a scale of 1 (not at all corrupt) to 5 (extremely corrupt), the Swiss rated their political parties at 3.3.

A Transparency International Switzerland report published in February 2024 also found that every second Swiss company that exports goods is confronted with demands for bribes or gifts. According to the study, 63% of companies comply with these demands.

Cases of excessive force, lengthy detention and abuse against migrants or asylum seekers have been reported. In some cases police officers have been given suspended sentences or suspended fines for using excessive force while arresting individuals.

Nepotism is considered an issue when dealing with corruption since many people know each other given the close proximity and social, economic and military structures in Switzerland.

The Helsinki Commission of the US Congress has strongly criticized the functioning of the Swiss judiciary and courts in 2023; namely by saying they are "corrupt".

=== Business ===
Regarding business and corruption, companies do not consider corruption a problem for doing business in Switzerland, and Swiss companies are active in Corporate Social Responsibility that are generally in line with OECD Guidelines for multinational enterprises.

But the Swiss system has also enabled some types of organisation to operate with little or no transparency or oversight such as those linked to commodities trade. According to the OECD:

Switzerland has a leading, and sometimes dominant, position in a number of the economic sectors that not only play a key role in its economy but also expose it to relatively acute risks of foreign bribery

Some recent examples include Novartis paying $729 million to settle bribery cases in the United States and Greece in 2020 or Zurich-based bank Julius Baer admitting to laundering over $36 million in bribes in a FIFA case in 2021. In 2021, Credit Suisse was prosecuted in a Mozambique tuna bonds corruption scandal in the United States. In 2022, Glencore paid up to $1.5 billion in penalties to resolve corruption claims with US, UK and Brazilian authorities.

=== Banking ===
In 2018, the advocacy group Tax Justice Network ranked Switzerland's banking sector as the "most corrupt" in the world due to a large offshore banking industry and very strict secrecy laws. These laws allow money laundering and hiding illegally obtained wealth. The Tax Justice Network's ranking attempts to measure how much assistance the country's legal systems provide to money laundering, and to protecting corruptly obtained wealth.

The enabling industry refers to lawyers, fiduciaries, notaries, and real estate agents who are helping the criminals invest or hide their ill-gotten monies. Their activity is not covered by the Swiss Anti-Money Laundering Act as long as they are only advising clients to place money in a particular financial institution or country.

In 2026, Pierre Mirabaud, the ex-head of the Swiss Bankers Association, was convicted of corruption, bribing public officials and money laundering and was given a two-year suspended sentence by the Swiss authorities.

=== Sports ===
Switzerland is at the center of sports corruption because many international sports organizations are headquartered there. For example, international sporting organisations (ISO's) can have the legal status of an international Non Governmental Organisation. Encouraged by the resulting range of legal and fiscal privileges, some 53 international sports organisations have their head office in Switzerland, with 46 of them in the Canton de Vaud alone. These include FIFA and the IOC.

== See also ==
- Crime in Switzerland
- 2015 FIFA corruption case
- International Anti-Corruption Academy
- Group of States Against Corruption
- International Anti-Corruption Day
- ISO 37001 Anti-bribery management systems
- United Nations Convention against Corruption
- OECD Anti-Bribery Convention
- Transparency International
