= Beresinalied =

Song

The "Beresinalied" (lit. 'Song of the [River] Beresina') is a popular Swiss folk song. Also known by its opening line, "Unser Leben gleicht der Reise", the German lyrics are based on the last four stanzas of a poem by Ludwig Giseke, called "Die Nachtreise" (lit. 'The Night Journey'), published in 1792. The melody was composed by Johann Immanuel Müller in 1832.

It became a symbol of the sacrifices of Swiss mercenaries in foreign service following popularization as Beresinalied by Otto von Greyerz and Gonzague de Reynold, tying it to the Battle of Berezina. The context is that Oberleutnant Thomas Legler, (1782–1835, born in Glarus) who served in the II corps of Marshal Nicolas Oudinot in Napoleon Bonaparte's invasion army in Russia in his memoirs Denkwürdigkeiten aus dem russischen Feldzug tells how his commander during the Battle on 28 November 1812 reminded him of the song and asked him to sing it.

Of the originally 8,000 men of the four Swiss regiments (division Merle), about 1,300 were left by the time the retreating army reached the Berezina River. Under General Jean Baptiste Eblé two bridges were built across the Berezina, and the second corps crossed to the western bank to beat back the Russian troops hindering the crossing. The Swiss engaged the Russian troops on 28 November 1812 on the road to Barysaŭ. The Russians pressed back the Swiss vanguard, trying to force them back into the river. Only 300 Swiss survived the day.

The French translation of the first stanza is put as epigraph of Journey to the End of the Night by Louis-Ferdinand Céline, erroneously attributed to the "Swiss Guards, 1793": «Notre vie est un voyage / Dans l'Hiver et dans la Nuit / Nous cherchons notre passage / Dans le Ciel où rien ne luit» (Our life is like a journey / Through the Winter and the Night; / We are looking for our way out / In a sky where everything is lightless).

German text by Ludwig Giseke	Translation
Unser Leben gleicht der Reise; Eines Wandrers in der Nacht; Jeder hat in seinem Gleise; Etwas, das ihm Kummer macht. Aber unerwartet schwindet Vor uns Nacht und Dunkelheit, Und der Schwergedrückte findet Linderung in seinem Leid. Mutig, mutig, liebe Brüder, Gebt das bange Sorgen auf; Morgen steigt die Sonne wieder Freundlich an dem Himmel auf. Darum lasst uns weitergehen; Weichet nicht verzagt zurück! Hinter jenen fernen Höhen; Wartet unser noch ein Glück.	Our life is like a journey Of a wanderer through the night; Everybody carries something on his way That causes him to grieve. But then unexpectedly do fade Night and darkness before us, And the sorely troubled find Solace in their sorrow. Fearless, fearless, dear brothers, Abandon the anxious worries; Tomorrow the sun will rise again Friendly in the sky. Therefore let us move on; Do not retreat disheartenedly! Beyond those far heights A new happiness awaits us.
