= Russian Elites, Proxies, and Oligarchs Task Force =

In March 2022 the Russian Elites, Proxies, and Oligarchs Task Force (REPOTF) was set up between the EU, G7 countries, and Australia. The signatories pledged to:

jointly commit to prioritizing our resources and working together to take all available legal steps to find, restrain, freeze, seize, and, where appropriate, confiscate or forfeit the assets of those individuals and entities that have been sanctioned in connection with Russia’s premeditated, unjust, and unprovoked invasion of Ukraine and the continuing aggression of the Russian regime. “Russia’s latest invasion of Ukraine represents a further assault on the fundamental norms and laws, including the UN charter, that underpin the international order. By working together to hunt down the assets of key Russian elites and proxies and to act against their enablers and facilitators, we take a further step to isolate them from the international financial system and impose consequences for their actions, and we encourage other countries to also take up this critical effort.

== History ==
On 11 August 2022, the REPOTF announced it had seized $30bn in assets.

By 24 February 2023, the anniversary date of the 2022 Russian invasion of Ukraine, the REPOTF had "Blocked or frozen more than $58 billion worth of sanctioned Russians’ assets in financial accounts and economic resources."
