= Humanitarian Fund for the Victims of the Holocaust =

The Humanitarian Fund for the Victims of the Holocaust was created by the Swiss Bankers Association (SBA) as a result of the "Meili Affair". The fund enabled the Swiss financial industry to participate in the process of paying reparations to the victims of Nazi looting during World War II that was abetted by Swiss banks and the failure of Swiss life insurance companies to honor the policies of Holocaust victims. The fund is administered by the International Commission on Holocaust Era Insurance Claims.

== The Meili Affair ==
Christoph Meili was a Swiss whistleblower, later granted political asylum in the United States, who was a guard at the Swiss bank Union Bank of Switzerland in Zürich, Switzerland, in 1997. He discovered that officials at UBS were destroying documents about orphaned assets, believed to be credit balances of deceased Jewish clients, victims of the Holocaust, whose heirs' whereabouts were unknown, as well as books from the German Reichsbank. They listed stock accounts for companies in business during the Holocaust, including BASF, Degussa, and Degesch. They listed real-estate records for Berlin property that had been seized by the Nazis, placed in Swiss accounts, and then claimed to be owned by UBS. Destruction of such documents is against Swiss laws. The "saved" documents reportedly predate the Nazi period, dating from 1897 to 1927.

On 8 January 1997, he took some bank files home. After a telephone conversation, he handed them over to a local Jewish organization, which brought the documents to the police, and eventually to the press, which published the document destruction on 14 January 1997. The Zürich authorities opened a judicial investigation against Meili for suspected violations of the Swiss laws on banking secrecy, which is a prosecutable offense ex officio in Switzerland. After Meili and his family reported receiving death threats they fled to the United States and were granted political asylum via private bill.

On 13 January 1998, Ed Fagan filed suit against UBS on behalf of the Jewish victims, in the amount of US$2.56 million. On 13 August 1998, a settlement was reached between the Swiss banks and the Jewish plaintiffs totalizing US$1.25 billion.

Meili's revelations turned the Swiss banks into international pariahs, both by exposing their morally dubious behavior in hiding Jewish assets purloined by the Nazis and those deposited by Jew fleeing Nazi genocide, and then their attempt to cover up their culpability by destroying documents. Credit Suisse Chairman Rainer Gut suggested the formation of the Fund to the SBA. The Meili affair also influenced the holding of the London Conference on Nazi Gold (1997).

== The Fund ==
The Humanitarian Fund for the Victims of the Holocaust is overseen by the International Commission on Holocaust Era Insurance Claims (ICHEIC), which was established in 1998. The organization and the fund were established as per settlement agreements with insurance companies and the German Foundation "Remembrance, Responsibility, and Future". The Fund finances humanitarian projects related to the Holocaust in two areas: paying out "humanitarian" claims, and funding social welfare and education programs.

=== Humanitarian Claims Payments ===
Humanitarian claims were evaluated and paid on two bases: those based on anecdotal evidence from Holocaust-era insurance policies, for which there is a lack of supporting documentation; and those for which successor insurance companies no longer exist. In the first category, token payments of US$1,000 were made on a per-claimant basis, symbolizing the fact that many claims cannot be substantiated. The ICHEIC offered 31,284 payments totaling US$31.28 million.

The second category humanitarian claims process covered insurance companies that were either nationalized or liquidated after World War II, for which no present-day successor company exists. Awards were based on the documentation submitted by claimants or discovered by ICHEIC through archival research. The ICHEIC made 2,874 category two offers totaling US$30.54 million.

Payouts were also made on a humanitarian basis for special cases, including top-up payments to raise the total policy payout on a policy to a minimum threshold set by ICHEIC, and also payouts to policies previously paid into blocked accounts.

=== Social Welfare & Education Programs ===
In addition, funds from restitution programs were used to finance social welfare programs for needy Nazi victims, as well as finance projects for Holocaust remembrance and education and the strengthening of Jewish identity through cultural programs.

The ICHEIC in 2003 committed US$132 million received from the German "Remembrance, Responsibility, and Future" Foundation to fund social welfare benefits for needy victims of the Nazis. The funds were fully disbursed by 2010.

The organization also created the ICHEIC Service Corps in 2003 to encourage university students to meet with local Holocaust survivors. The program was run by Hillel in New York, New York, and the University of Miami in Miami, Florida, and began operations in the fall semester of 2004. It ran through the 2009/10 academic year and was financed with $1.8 million.

The ICHEIC also funded the Initiative to Bring Jewish Cultural Literacy to Youth in the Former Soviet Union, which was developed and administered by the Jewish Agency for Israel. The program sought to promote Jewish identify in the FSU, expand understanding of the Holocaust, and fight antisemitism.

The ICHEIC also launched a Program for Holocaust Education in Europe, which was developed and implemented by Yad Vashem. The program seeks to preserve the memory of the Holocaust and teach its lessons to new generations of Europeans, as well as combat antisemitism. Scheduled to last through 2020, the ICHEIC committed over US$12 million in funds to the program.

In 2005, the ICHEIC also provided a one-time grant of US$500,000 to the March of the Living that sponsors an annual symbolic march in Poland from Auschwitz to Birkenau to honor those murdered in the Holocaust. The program seeks to teach Jewish youth about Nazi crimes in order to ensure that genocide does not occur again.
