= Boris Collardi =

Swiss-Italian bank manager

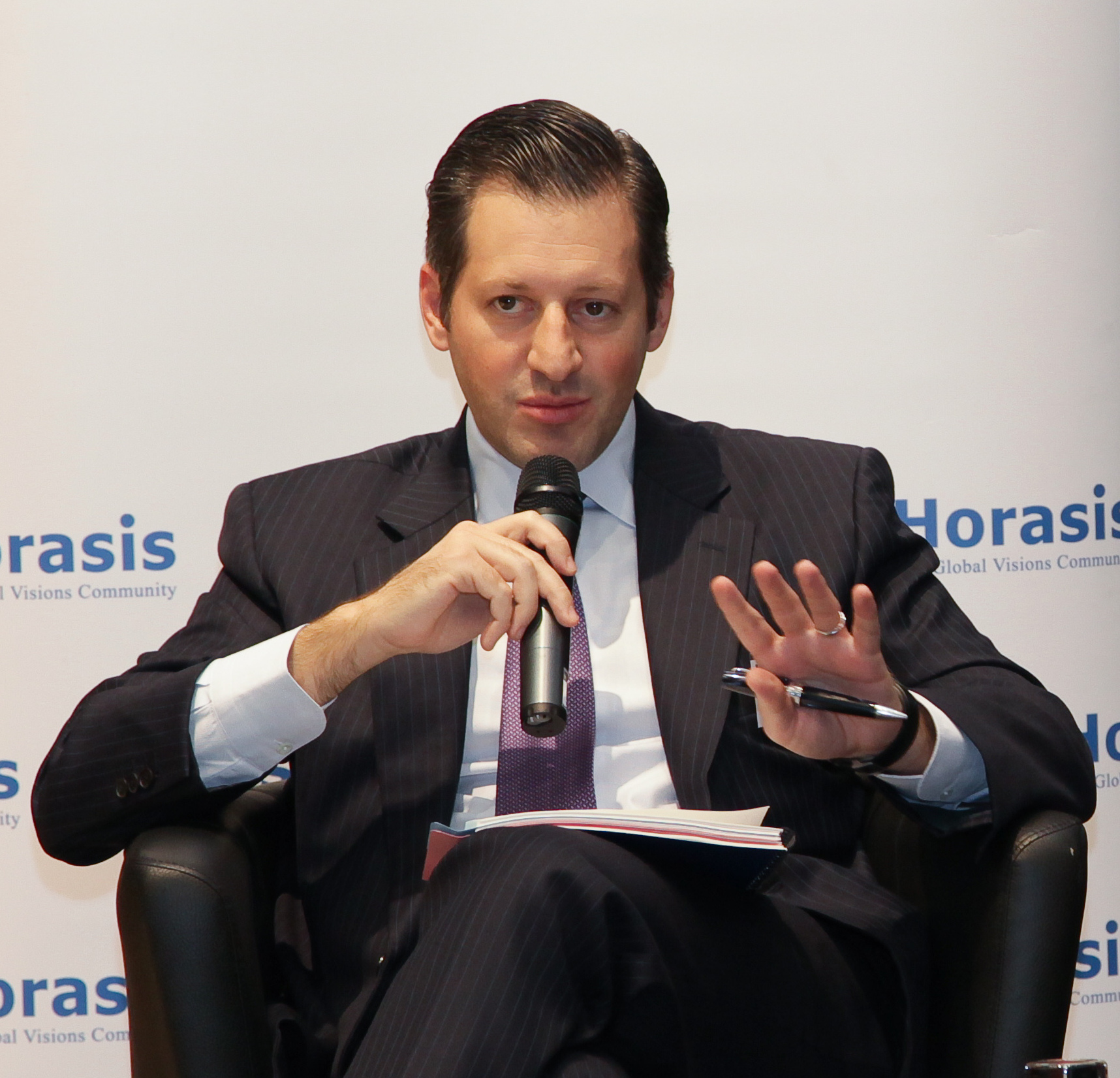
- Born: Boris Francesco Jean Collardi; 17 July 1974 (age 51)
- Occupations: Banker; partner The Pictet Group; former CEO and chairman Julius Baer Group

Boris Francesco Jean Collardi (born 17 July 1974) is a Swiss-Italian banker who used to serve as a partner at Pictet Group. Having joined the Julius Baer Private Bank as COO in 2006, he was the CEO from May 2009 until his unexpected resignation and move to competitor Pictet in November 2017.

== Early years ==
Boris Collardi grew up in Nyon, where he obtained an accounting major from the Cessouest School in 1993. Subsequently, he joined the Career Start Program at Credit Suisse in Geneva. From 1995 until 2006 he was active in various functions at Credit Suisse. Commencing as an analyst in the Investment Research Group in Zürich, he worked his way through the ranks, including two stints in Singapore, before taking the role of private banking CFO in 2003 and becoming private banking COO of EMENA and head of special projects in 2004.

== Julius Baer ==
=== Becoming CEO ===
In 2006, Collardi joined the Julius Baer Bank as COO following its acquisition of three private banks and GAM, a Swiss asset management company, in 2005. The publication "Global Custodian" credits him as a decisive factor behind the successful integration of these banks and the subsequent establishment of Julius Baer as "one of the premier addresses in global wealth management". In 2008, he topped the Wealth Bulletin top-40 list of rising stars under the age of 40 among over 300 contenders. Only one year later, following the death of Julius Baer Group CEO Alex Widmer, Collardi was chosen to succeed interim CEO Johannes de Gier, in the process becoming the bank's youngest-ever chief executive.

The Wall Street Journal describes what followed as "an aggressive, acquisitive expansion". At the end of 2009, the bank had 150 billion Swiss francs in assets under management, 80% were booked in Switzerland. Since then, Julius Baer has more than doubled its assets under management, totaling 393 billion Swiss francs in October 2017. Acquiring Merrill Lynch's international wealth business in 2013 marked the largest single increase in AUM. Diversifying into new markets was also part of the declared strategy – by 2013 more than 75% of the bank's net new money originated from emerging markets, with Asia in first place followed closely by the Middle East. In 2014, Bank Leumi's Swiss and Luxembourg business were acquired, with Commerzbank's Luxembourg division and a majority stake in Italian asset manager Kairos following in 2016. In 2015, Jimmy Lee was hired from Credit Suisse to spearhead Julius Baer's Asian expansion, with the target of becoming the bank's "second home market". Citing cost and complexity of a multi-market presence, Collardi predicted private banks would either focus exclusively on one or two markets, become part of a gigantic, integrated firm offering all facets of banking (asset management, commercial, investment and private banking), or achieve the critical mass to be able to afford an international pure-play private bank, the latter of which formed the basis of his strategy. While keen on expansion, he stressed the importance of organic growth through direct hire and client acquisitions. Asked about some of the failed attempts by competitors to enter the Asian market, Collardi remarked, "We look at three things: costs, investments and three-year revenue growth. At the beginning of each year, we are prudent and adjust short-term expenses and decrease headcount where needed." Regarding management, he stressed the importance of keeping people in their functions for many years, eliminating the need to re-explain the strategy and building long-term trust with clients. Consequently, the bank's structure was divided into five markets with independent leadership: Switzerland, Europe, Asia, Latin America and emerging markets, in order to better cater to each's individual idiosyncrasies. Despite his ambitions, Collardi noted the importance of risk management when evaluating takeovers, going as far as to call them potential atomic bombs. As of 2016, Julius Baer planned to invest several hundred million Swiss francs into technology and was developing a new centralized, fully digital IT platform, to be rolled out worldwide. Simultaneously, Collardi admitted that the bank had been a "late adopter" of technological advancements during a Financial Times interview. Going forward, however, he expressed his enthusiasm for blockchain and its potential to improve transactional products and services, such as international money transfers or stock market trading. He reaffirmed this stance two years later, saying the execution and back office aspects of the value chain will become fully automated and allow for increasingly customizable products. The value creation will shift from transaction execution, which becomes a low-cost commodity, to advisory, with additional resources allocated to direct client contact, understanding clients' needs and improving the advice provided. As of 2018, Luxembourg and Asia have migrated to the new platform. According to Collardi, the rollout will be completed by 2020. At the time of his departure, the bank's price-to-book valuation was roughly double that of local rivals UBS and Credit Suisse.

=== Resignation ===
On 27 November 2017, Julius Baer announced the resignation of its CEO Boris Collardi, effective immediately, due to his decision to take on a new position as partner of The Pictet Group, a direct competitor. Chief Risk Officer Bernhard Hodler assumed the CEO position, with the bank announcing an evaluation process addressing the long-term leadership of the group. In September 2017, Bernhard Hodler was announced to be replaced as chief risk officer by Oliver Bartholet, coming from UBS, effective 1 April 2018, with Hodler becoming deputy to the CEO. There was speculation at the time as to Hodler being the intended successor to Chairman of the Board Daniel Sauter, who would be hitting the 12-year term limit in 2019. At the annual shareholder meeting in April 2018, Chairman Sauter announced Hodler was appointed to guide the bank in the long run and not as an interim solution.

While the bank was generally considered to be in good shape by the company chairman Daniel Sauter, analysts as well as media outlets, his strong leadership position in the bank and the abrupt departure were considered risk factors towards the market valuation and mid-term success of the bank. Key shareholder Harris Associates also expressed their disappointment. Shares opened down 4.2% following the news. The news, while unexpected, should not have come as a complete surprise according to sources within the industry, as Collardi was known for his drive and affinity towards challenges and had largely implemented his vision for Julius Baer since taking over the realms in 2009.

In 2021, Collardi was reprimanded by Switzerland's financial regulator FINMA over a money laundering probe that is described as casting "a shadow over his move to Geneva private bank Pictet & Cie."

== Pictet ==
At Pictet, Collardi assumed the role of partner alongside Nicolas Pictet, Renaud de Planta, Rémy Best, with whom he ran the bank's global wealth management business, Marc Pictet, Bertrand Demole and Laurent Ramsey. He was the first outsider to join in almost 20 years and one of only 42 to ever hold such as position. Despite the company's smaller size, though the 492 billion Swiss francs in AUM are greater than at his former employer, Collardi stressed his desire to be more of an entrepreneur than employee as a key factor in his decision to take on the role. Due to Pictet's legal structure, Collard's new compensation plan will likely never be released to the public, but his departure from Julius Baer did result in a considerable compensation cut including not receiving a bonus for 2017 and leaving behind over 7 million francs worth of unvested stock awards.

Despite Pictet's reserved attitude regarding public commentary, the bank has conceded its need to grow in Asia. Collardi's extensive experience in Asia, a region where Pictet's presence is comparatively small at US$36 billion AUM relative to Julius Baer's 65 billion USD, makes him a good fit for the bank. It has, however, also fueled speculation on the potential for poaching not only employees but client assets from his former employer. Collardi excluded this possibility, indicating there was enough room for both to grow, and mentioned that in any case getting to know the existing teams was required before decisions on additional hires could be made. Given Pictet's 213-year history, traditional approach and tendency to hire from within the company, his appointment also made possible culture clashes a topic, considering Collardi's extensive personal network and tendency to be directly involved with staffing decisions. Nicolas Pictet, the eighth-generation to run the bank, remarked that, on the contrary, he sees Collardi as a powerful endorsement of the continued strategy of "independence, organic growth and focus on the long term". In 2020, his move to Pictet was critically described as a strain in several media articles.

In April 2022, some eight months after his resignation from Pictet, private bank EFG International announced that Collardi had taken a 3.6% stake in the bank and would join its board of directors.
