= Julius Baer =

Swiss banker (1857–1922)

- Swiss passport photo of Julius Baer issued in 1920

Founder and president of Julius Baer Group
- In office 1890 – 1922 (his death)

Personal details
- Born: Isaac Baer; 2 January 1857 Heidelsheim, Grand Duchy of Baden, German Confederation
- Died: 9 March 1922 (aged 65) Riehen, Basel-Stadt, Switzerland
- Citizenship: Badenian (1857–1871); German (1871–1907); Swiss (1907–1922)
- Spouse: Marie Ulrich (m. 1891)
- Relations: Hans J. Baer (grandson)
- Children: 3, including Richard J. Baer
- Occupation: Banker and businessman

Julius Baer (German: [bɛːɐ̯]; né Isaac Baer; born 2 January 1857 – 9 March 1922) was a German-born Swiss banker, businessman and philanthropist. Baer was the founder and namesake of Julius Baer Group, and the patriarch of the Baer family.

== Early life and education ==
Baer was born in Heidelsheim (today part of Bruchsal), Grand Duchy of Baden to Joseph (1816–1891) and Rosina (née Dreyfuss; 1819–1907) Baer, into a Jewish family. His father worked as private money lender and merchant of animal skins, while his mother was a homemaker. He was the second youngest of five siblings. Baer was educated at the Jewish School of Heidelsheim and completed a banking apprenticeship at Bankhaus August Gerstle in Augsburg from 1883 to 1885.

== Career ==
In 1886, he became a partner in the private bank Samuel Dukas & Co. in Basel, Switzerland. A position he continued to hold until 1896, when he was deployed by his brother-in-law Ludwig Hirschhorn, to Zurich. He became a partner in Bank Hirschhorn, Uhl & Bär, which existed since 1890, and is the ultimate predecessor of today's Julius Baer Group. Since 1901, the bank bore only his name, and was known as Julius Bär & Co., which became one of the leading Swiss private banks.

He was on several board of directors including Lake Thun railway line, Südostbahn and Oerlikon-Bührle (1908–1922).

== Family ==
In 1891, he married Marie Ulrich (1869–1917), with whom he had three sons;

- Richard Josef Baer (1892–1940), mathematician and physicist
- Walter Jakob Baer (1895–1970), director at Julius Baer
- Werner Baer (1899–1960), director at Julius Baer and art collector (namely exhibited at Kunsthaus Zürich)

His grandson, Hans J. Baer (1927–2011), was a long-term executive director and president of Julius Baer, who became known through his involvement as a mediator in retrieving Jewish funds in the Volcker Commission in the 1990s.

== Literature ==
- Publications about Julius Baer in the Swiss National Library
- Baer, Julius by Ueli Müller in Historical Dictionary of Switzerland (HLS)
