= List of disbarments in the United States =

This is a list of disbarments affecting notable lawyers in the United States.

| Name | Jurisdiction(s) | Date disbarred | Date reinstated | Reason/Details |
|---|---|---|---|---|
| Spiro T. Agnew | Maryland | May 2, 1974 | — | No contest plea to bribery and tax evasion. |
| James Alexander | New York | April 16, 1735 | 1737 | Retaliatory measure for defending John Peter Zenger from sedition. |
| F. Lee Bailey | Florida | 2001 | — | Misconduct while defending Claude Duboc. Filed for reinstatement in Massachusetts in 2005, but has not yet been reinstated. Applied for reinstatement in Maine in 2013, and approved by a judge of the state's Supreme Judicial Court, but decision appealed by the state Board of Bar Examiners, requiring a rehearing by the entire court. Case heard by the full court on January 14, 2014; the court announced on April 10 that it had voted 4–2 to deny Bailey admission. |
| F. Lee Bailey | Massachusetts | April 11, 2003 | — | Reciprocal with Florida. |
| Paul Bergrin | New Jersey | December 9, 2016 | — | Suspended in 2009, and disbarred in 2016, following his conviction of numerous felonies, including conspiracy to murder a witness. |
| Paul Bergrin | New York | January 14, 2010 | — | Suspended in 2009, and disbarred in 2010, following his guilty plea to two counts of conspiracy to promote prostitution. |
| Rod Blagojevich | Illinois | May 18, 2020 | — | Former Governor of Illinois impeached and removed from office for corruption, which includes racketeering conspiracy, wire fraud, extortion, conspiracy, attempted extortion, bribery, and making false statements to federal agents. |
| Eric Louis Boetzel | New York | February 13, 1920 | | Former Assistant District Attorney. Convicted and sentenced to two years in prison for mail fraud. |
| Frank J. Brasco | New York | 1973 | — | Received five years in prison upon conviction of federal bribery and conspiracy charges. |
| Tommy Burnett | Tennessee | 1990 | 2003 | Convicted of multiple felonies as a result of the Operation Rocky Top political corruption investigation. |
| Thomas J. Capano | Delaware | November 15, 2001 | — | Convicted of murder. |
| Laurence Canter | Tennessee | 1997 | — | In part for unethical practices in marketing legal service (i.e. through spamming). |
| Mark Ciavarella | Pennsylvania | October 31, 2019 | — | Former president judge of the Luzerne County Court of Common Pleas along with Michael Conahan convicted for the Kids for Cash scandal and currently serving 28 years in federal prison. He was originally disbarred in February 2009 along with Conahan before losing his law license for good ten years later. |
| Harry E. Claiborne | Nevada | 1986 | — | Former United States District Judge for the District of Nevada impeached from office for tax evasion. |
| Daniel H. Coakley | Massachusetts | May 12, 1922 | — | Found guilty of deceit, malpractice, and gross misconduct. |
| Michael Cohen | New York | February 26, 2019 | — | Pled guilty to lying to Congress and violating campaign finance law. |
| Roy Cohn | New York | June 23, 1986 | — | Unethical and unprofessional conduct of misappropriation of clients' funds, lying on a bar application and pressuring a client to amend his will in Cohn's favor. |
| Robert Frederick Collins | Louisiana | January 9, 1995 | — | Served five years in prison for bribery. |
| Michael Conahan | Pennsylvania | February 2009 | — | Former president judge of the Luzerne County Court of Common Pleas along with Mark Ciavarella convicted for the Kids for Cash scandal. Sentenced to 17.5 years in prison, Conahan was transferred in 2020 to home confinement, with an anticipated release date of 2026, under a provision of the CARES Act that authorized such transfers as a response to the COVID19 pandemic. |
| William J. Corcoran | Massachusetts | 1921 | — | Found guilty of conspiring with Middlesex County District Attorney Nathan A. Tufts to use the threat of criminal indictment to extort money from people. |
| Edward DeSaulnier | Massachusetts | January 11, 1972 | — | Accepting bribes from a criminal defendant |
| Marc Stuart Dreier | New York | October 8, 2009 | — | Violation of New York's insider trading statute and General Business Law |
| Ed Fagan | New York | December 2008 | — | Failed to pay court fines and fees in Holocaust Case |
| Ed Fagan | New Jersey | January 2009 | — | Convicted for stealing money from Holocaust survivors. |
| Thomas Finneran | Massachusetts | 2010 | — | Plead guilty to criminal obstruction of justice. |
| Joe Ganim | Connecticut | March 2003 | — | Mayor of Bridgeport resigned from office upon his conviction for one count each of racketeering, extortion, racketeering conspiracy, and bribery; two counts of bribery conspiracy; eight counts of mail fraud, and two counts of filing a false tax return. He was released in 2010 after serving seven years in prison and worked for his family's law firm as a legal assistant before getting his old job back as mayor in 2015. |
| Rudy Giuliani | New York | July 2, 2024 | — | Made false allegations about mass voter fraud and his participation in the January 6, 2021, Attack on the United States Capitol in an effort to subvert the 2020 Presidential Election. |
| Rudy Giuliani | District of Columbia | September 26, 2024 | — | Reciprocal with New York State. |
| David E. Harrison | Massachusetts | 2006 | — | Found to have interfered with the Commission on Judicial Conduct's inquiry of his conduct during a Gloucester, Massachusetts zoning board hearing. |
| Stanley Hilton | California | 2012 | — | Misconduct |
| Alger Hiss | New York | 1952 | 1975 | Convicted of perjury |
| Abraham J. Isserman | New Jersey | 1952 | June 30, 1961 | Contempt of court during Foley Square trial, and failure to disclose conviction for statutory rape |
| Andrew Jenkins | New York | 1991 | — | Sentenced to one year and one day in jail for money laundering |
| E. Stewart Jones, Jr. | New York | July 18, 2024 | — | admitted misappropriating client funds, mingling, and improperly bookkeeping. |
| Kathleen Kane | Pennsylvania | March 2019 | — | Resigned from the office of Pennsylvania Attorney General upon her conviction for perjury, obstruction of justice and related charges for illegal activities while holding office. Her law license was suspended in September 2015 before being revoked four years later. |
| Kathleen Kane | Middle District of Pennsylvania | July 2019 | — | Reciprocal with Pennsylvania. |
| Menis Ketchum | West Virginia | October 4, 2018 | — | Pleaded guilty to one count of wire fraud while serving as a Justice of the West Virginia Supreme Court of Appeals. |
| Kwame Kilpatrick | Michigan | 2008 | — | Former Mayor of Detroit pleaded No contest to one count of assaulting a police officer and guilty to two felony obstruction of justice charges. Granted a pardon by then-President Donald Trump less than 12 hours before his term ended. |
| Egil Krogh | Washington | 1975 | 1980 | Convicted of conspiracy to violate civil rights of Daniel Ellsberg |
| Charles Kushner | New Jersey, New York, and Pennsylvania | 2005 | — | Former real estate developer and lawyer pleaded guilty to 18 counts of illegal campaign contributions, tax evasion, and witness tampering. Served 14 months at Federal Prison Camp, Montgomery in Alabama before being sent to a halfway house in Newark, New Jersey, to complete his sentence and was released August 25, 2006. Received a federal pardon by then-President Donald Trump (who is his son, Jared's father-in-law) December 23, 2020. |
| Lewis Libby | District of Columbia | March 20, 2008 | — | Convicted of four of five felony counts of obstruction of justice, perjury, and making false statements to a grand jury and federal investigators, in United States v. Libby, pertaining to the Plame affair and related CIA leak grand jury investigation. |
| Lewis Libby | Pennsylvania | December 10, 2008 | — | Reciprocal with District of Columbia. |
| Richard P. Liebowitz | New York | March 13, 2024 | — | |
| G. Gordon Liddy | New York | 1973 | — | Mastermind behind the Watergate burglary and refused to testify at Nixon's trial, resulting in a sentence of 52 months out of his 20 years in prison. |
| Ed Mangano | New York | October 8, 2019 | — | Former County Executive of Nassau County convicted of bribery and corruption along with his wife Linda and former Oyster Bay Town supervisor John Venditto. With he and his wife having been sentenced to 20 years in prison, he did not seek reelection for a third term. |
| Marvin Mandel | Maryland | October 29, 1982 | July 6, 1989 | Mail fraud and racketeering. |
| C. Vernon Mason | New York | January 26, 1995 | — | Price gouging, theft, and abandoning clients. |
| John N. Mitchell | New York | July 3, 1975 | — | Perjury |
| Richard "Alex" Murdaugh | South Carolina | July 12, 2022 | — | Murder of his wife and son. |
| Michael D. Murphy | Texas and Louisiana | 1984, 1985 | — | |
| Mike Nifong | North Carolina | 2007 | — | Prosecutorial misconduct while prosecuting the Duke lacrosse case. |
| Richard Nixon | New York | August 9, 1976 | — | Obstruction of justice related to Watergate. |
| Joseph C. Pelletier | Massachusetts | May 8, 1922 | — | Removed from the office of Suffolk County, Massachusetts District Attorney for using his office to aid in blackmail and extortion. |
| Fred Phelps | Kansas | July 20, 1979 | — | Conduct during his lawsuit against court reporter Carolene Brady. |
| Fred Phelps | United States federal courts | 1989 (ceased practicing) | — | Already excluded from Kansas state courts by his disbarment, Phelps agreed to cease practicing in federal courts as part of the settlement for a 1985 disciplinary complaint by nine federal judges. |
| Thomas Porteous | Louisiana | January 2011 | — | Former United States District Judge for the Eastern District of Louisiana who voluntarily surrendered his state law license after being impeached by the United States House of Representatives and removed from office by the United States Senate on December 8, 2010. |
| Michael E. Reiburn | New York | 1935 | — | Disbarred for unethical practices, later for the same case sentenced to five years in prison for fraud. |
| Stewart Rhodes | Montana | December 8, 2015 | — | Leader of the Oath Keepers disbarred by the Montana Supreme Court for conduct violating the Montana Rules of Professional Conduct, after refusing to respond to two bar grievances filed against him in the federal district court of Arizona. Several years after disbarment, he was also a participant of the January 6 United States Capitol attack, with which he was convicted of November 2022 and sentenced to 18 years in prison. |
| Paul J. Sheehy | Massachusetts | 1975 | — | Convicted of bank fraud and three counts of making false statements in Lowell Bank and Trust Co.'s books. |
| Mitch Skandalakis | Georgia | 2005 | — | Convicted of making a false statement to an FBI investigator. |
| Joel Steinberg | New York | 1987 | — | First Degree Manslaughter |
| Lynne Stewart | New York | 2005 | — | Convicted in Federal Court of aiding terrorists and defrauding the U.S. government. |
| Pat Swindall | Georgia | 1996 | — | Sentenced to one year in prison and paid a fine of $30,450 for perjury related to a money laundering in his involvement in a drug trafficking operation. |
| Andrew Thomas | Arizona | April 2012 | — | Former Maricopa County attorney launched unethical attacks on political enemies, filed malicious and unfounded criminal charges and committed perjury. |
| Jack Thompson | Florida | 2008 | — | Found guilty of 27 counts of professional misconduct, including verbal harassment and intimidation |
| Jerome P. Troy | Massachusetts | 1973 | — | An investigation by the Massachusetts Supreme Judicial Court found that Troy, a Judge of the Dorchester District Court, had lied under oath while answering questions in a lawsuit brought by an insurance company following his wife's death, pressured an attorney into making a political contribution to Francis X. Bellotti, "willfully directed the filling of Tenean Creek in an illegal manner" and subsequently lied during his testimony in a suit brought against him for the filling, had a court officer work on his marina project during court hours, and obtained free legal services from attorneys who practiced in his court. |
| Nathan A. Tufts | Massachusetts | June 19, 1922 | — | Found guilty of misconduct or breach of his duties as Middlesex County, Massachusetts District Attorney. His malfeasance included extorting money from Paramount Studio who attended a party at Mishawum Manor, a Woburn, Massachusetts brothel and falsely reporting the location of an escaped murder's capture to shield those who aided the fugitive from prosecution. |
