= Stefan Bollinger =

Swiss banker

- Citizenship: Switzerland
- Education: CFA Institute European Federation of Financial Analysts Societies Winterthur Business School
- Occupation: Chief Executive Officer
- Employer: Julius Baer Group
- Organization(s): Royal Academy of Arts, London
- Term: January 2025 -
- Predecessor: Nic Dreckmann
- Board member of: Trustees of the London School of Architecture AllChild

Stefan Bollinger (born 1974) is a Swiss banker, who is the current chief executive officer (CEO) of Julius Baer Group.

== Career ==
Bollinger started his career at Zürcher Kantonalbank as an Interest Rate Derivatives Trader from 1993 - 1996, later joining Finex with the role of Derivatives Sales, before moving to JPMorgan Chase in London in 1999.

Afterwards, he joined Goldman Sachs in 2004, where he stayed for 20 years. He held both the positions of Head of Switzerland and Co-Head of Global Sale Strategies & Structuring there. Later on, Bollinger was appointed Co-Head of Private Wealth Management in the Europe, Middle East, and Africa (EMEA) region in February 2019. During his tenure there, he assisted in the upgrading of Goldman's Zurich Office, while also having doubled assets under management over the past five years.

In July 2024, he was appointed to the role of chief executive officer of Julius Baer, his current position. This was after the then CEO, Philipp Rickenbache, was ousted after the bank lost 586 million Swiss Francs on loan to the collapsed property firm Signa, with Nic Dreckmann acting as the temporary CEO for the time being.

On the 9th of January in 2025, Bollinger started his work at Julius Baer. He has introduced several different measures within the company from his time at Goldman Sachs, such as reducing the size of the executive board from 15 to 5, a streamlined regional setup and the formation of a new global wealth management committee and global products & solutions unit, along with the election of ex-HSBC CEO Noel Quinn as board chair in May. Through further efficiency measures, he hopes to cut costs amounting to 130 million Swiss francs ($159 million) by 2028.

== Chairmanships and board memberships ==
In January 2024, Bollinger was appointed as chair of the Board of Trustees of the London School of Architecture.

He is also a trustee of the Royal Academy of Arts in London, and a board member of AllChild, a charitable foundation promoting social equality.

== Awards and recognition ==
Spears Wealth Management Survey featured Bollinger in the Notable Power List in 2024. He was named the "Personality of the Year" at the SRP 2023 Europe Awards.
