= Julius Baer Group controversies =

Logo

Julius Baer Group, a Swiss private banking group, has faced numerous controversies over its business practices, raising concerns about the bank's ethical practices and regulatory compliance. These controversies have prompted calls for increased transparency and accountability within the banking industry. The Julius Baer Group, founded in the late 19th century by Julius Baer, has traditionally adhered to Swiss-style banking secrecy, which has come under scrutiny by investigators in the United States and Europe for potentially aiding tax evasion by clients.

== Tax evasion allegations ==
Julius Baer, a Swiss bank, has settled an investigation by the United States authorities into helping American clients avoid paying taxes. The bank has agreed to pay $547.25 million and will not face prosecution, thanks to a Deferred Prosecution Agreement. This settlement concludes the investigation into the bank's practices from the 1990s to 2009, where it assisted wealthy Americans in hiding their assets to evade taxes.

The U.S. Department of Justice highlighted Julius Baer's admission of its wrongdoing and cooperation with the investigation as a factor in the agreement. The bank's CEO, Boris Collardi, remarked that this settlement marks a significant point for Julius Baer, allowing it to move past a period of uncertainty and focus on its future operations.

The Department of Justice detailed how Julius Baer advised its staff to avoid drawing attention to their activities in the U.S., including using Swiss registered phones and paying for calling cards in cash to leave no trace of their communications with U.S. clients. At its highest point in 2007, the bank managed about $4.7 billion in assets for U.S. clients seeking to cheat on their taxes, earning an estimated $87 million in profits from these activities between 2001 and 2011.

Additionally, two former bank advisers pleaded guilty to aiding U.S. customers in tax evasion, facing up to five years in prison. These penalties come as part of broader actions against Swiss banks by U.S. authorities, including hefty fines against other institutions like Credit Suisse and UBS for similar offenses.

The Swiss Financial Market Supervisory Authority (FINMA) also reprimanded Julius Baer for its conduct regarding U.S. clients, noting that the bank had taken steps to comply with regulatory requirements since. The case underscores ongoing efforts by U.S. and Swiss authorities to address and penalize financial institutions involved in facilitating tax evasion.

The bank has also been criticized for lapses in anti-money laundering controls, leading to a fine by Swiss regulators in 2020 for compliance shortcomings.

== Julius Baer Group vs. WikiLeaks: Cayman Islands documents controversy ==
The lawsuit between Bank Julius Baer & Co. and WikiLeaks in 2008 focused on the bank's attempt to remove confidential documents from the WikiLeaks website. These documents were related to the bank's operations in the Cayman Islands, involving anonymizing trusts for clients between 1997 and 2002. The controversy began when Rudolf Elmer, a former employee, was suspected of leaking the documents. In 2011, Elmer announced plans to provide WikiLeaks with more offshore account details, leading to legal actions by the bank.

Bank Julius Baer filed a lawsuit and succeeded in getting a permanent injunction from Judge Jeffrey White, which forced the domain registrar Dynadot to lock the wikileaks.org domain, making the site inaccessible through its domain name. This action, however, did not affect mirror sites or access to WikiLeaks via its IP address. The lawsuit and injunction drew significant media attention and criticism, invoking the Streisand effect—a phenomenon where attempts to suppress information only increase public interest in it.

The bank's legal action faced opposition from various media and civil liberties groups, including the Electronic Frontier Foundation (EFF) and the American Civil Liberties Union (ACLU), who challenged the injunction on First Amendment grounds. Judge White later lifted the injunction on 29 February 2008, restoring access to the WikiLeaks domain.

Following the lifting of the injunction and widespread public and legal support for WikiLeaks, Bank Julius Baer dropped the case on 5 March 2008. The lawsuit highlighted issues of privacy, free speech, and the public's right to know, and it demonstrated the challenges of controlling information in the digital age.

== The Julius Baer Group CEO suicide ==
Alex Widmer, CEO of Bank Julius Baer, died by suicide in December 2008 amid heightened regulatory scrutiny of Swiss banking practices. His death occurred during a turbulent period for the Swiss banking sector, with significant implications for the bank's stock performance.

== Financial Times investigation into fraud at Julius Baer ==
In October 2023, the Financial Times reported the case of Gregory and Vera Mirlas, a pseudonym for a couple who fell victim to an alleged fraud by their Swiss wealth adviser, Benjamin G, while banking with Julius Bär, one of Switzerland's most prestigious private banks. The couple, originally from the Soviet Union, had amassed considerable wealth through the medical startup Medinol, which they co-founded. Upon legal changes in Israel in 1998, they chose to store their savings in Switzerland, entrusting them to Benjamin G, who later moved to Julius Bär and then established his own advisory firm, Constanza. The Mirlases' troubles began to unravel during a casual lunch with a friend, a Goldman Sachs banker, in Juan-les-Pins, France, leading to the discovery of unauthorized transactions from their accounts. Investigations revealed that Benjamin had misappropriated approximately CHF22 million for personal gain, including purchasing luxury properties and a yacht. Despite the evidence and Benjamin's eventual conviction and sentencing to three years in prison, with a requirement to repay over CHF13 million, the Mirlases faced resistance from Julius Baer in acknowledging any responsibility. The case highlighted broader issues within the Julius Baer Group fraudulent constant activity and brought the attention of Swiss financial regulators.

== Allegations of fund concealment ==
Recent allegations have implicated Julius Baer in schemes involving fund concealment and money laundering, including the case of former Formula One executive Bernie Ecclestone. Additionally, Julius Baer was mentioned in connection with funds belonging to a former Russian minister of information. This case came to light through data analysis from a hack and involves allegations that the minister enriched himself with state assets after the turn of the millennium. The funds, managed by Julius Baer among other banks, highlight the risks and reputational hazards associated with managing assets for politically exposed persons (PEPs) and the importance of due diligence in preventing financial misconduct.
