= Hans J. Baer =

Swiss banker (1927–2011)

- Baer in 1996

Chairman and President of Julius Baer Group
- In office 1975–1996
- Succeeded by: Raymond J. Baer

Personal details
- Born: Hans Julius Baer; 26 September 1927 Zürich, Switzerland
- Died: 21 March 2011 (aged 83) Zürich, Switzerland
- Relations: Julius Baer (grandfather)
- Children: 2
- Education: Lehigh University (BS); Columbia University (MA)
- Occupation: Financial executive; philanthropist; writer
- Profession: Banker

Hans Julius Baer (26 September 1927 – 21 March 2011) was a Swiss banker who served as partner, president of the executive board and chairman of Julius Baer Group, founded by his grandfather, Julius Baer. He also served as advocate and mediator in retrieving lost Jewish funds in the Volcker Commission in the 1990s.

== Early life and education ==
Baer was born 26 September 1927 in Zürich, Switzerland, the second of four children, to Richard Baer, a professor of physics at ETH Zurich, and Ellen Baer (née Lohnstein; later Weyl), originally from Worms, Germany. His father became a professor and senior lecturer in 1928 and since 1922, was also a limited partner in Julius Baer. He died shortly before the planned emigration to the United States in 1940 aged 48.

Baer, then aged 14, arrived in the United States with his mother and siblings in May 1941. He was primarily raised in Princeton, New Jersey where the family now resided. In 1950, his mother married fellow scientist Hermann Weyl. Baer graduated from Lehigh University with a Bachelor of Science in industrial engineering in 1947 and a Master of Arts in economics from Columbia University in 1950.

== Career ==
Baer became a partner in Julius Baer Group in 1960, was president of the executive board from 1975 to 1993 and finally remained chairman of the board until 1996.

== Personal life ==
Baer was married to Ilse Kaelin (1920–2002) with whom he had two children;

- Monique Baer, an engineer agronomist and philanthropist in sustainable investments.
- Raymond Julius Baer (born 1959), who served as president of the board of Julius Baer Group from 2003 to 2012 and as honorary president since 2012. He firstly married to Gabriele Baer (née Richner) and secondly to Carolina Müller-Möhl in late 2025.

He died 21 March 2011 in Zürich, Switzerland aged 83 after long illness.

== Literature ==
- The Banking System of Switzerland. Dissertation, New York University, Buchdr. Neumann, 1951 (in German)
- Seid umschlungen, Millionen. Ein Leben zwischen Pearl Harbor und Ground Zero. Orell Füssli, Zürich 2004, ISBN 3-280-06041-9 (in German)
