= Julius Bar =

Julius Bar can refer to:

- Julius (New York City), a historic gay bar in New York City
- Julius Baer Group, a Swiss bank founded by Julius Bär
