= Christoph Meili =

Swiss-American whistleblower (born 1968)

- Born: Michel Christopher Meili; April 21, 1968 (age 58)
- Citizenship: Switzerland; United States (since 2005)
- Education: Chapman University
- Occupations: Whistleblower; former security professional
- Known for: Violating Swiss banking secrecy laws by alerting third parties that UBS were destroying Holocaust-era documentation.
- Spouse: Giuseppina Intelisano (m. 1989; div. 2002)
- Children: 2

Michel Christopher "Christoph" Meili (born 21 April 1968) is a Swiss-American whistleblower and former security professional. In 1997, Meili illegally disclosed to third parties that Swiss bank Union Bank of Switzerland (UBS) was destroying documentation of Holocaust-era assets. After a federal arrest warrant, a set of fines, and death threats were issued to him, Meili fled Switzerland to the United States by right of asylum in late 1997, returning to his home country in 2009.

His disclosure was one of the factors prompting a US$1.25 billion settlement between multiple Swiss banks and Jewish victims in August 1998. Meili was entitled to $750,000 of the settlement. He returned to Switzerland having spent all his settlement money and to mixed reception by Swiss papers.

== Whistleblowing ==
In early 1997, Meili was working as a night guard at the Union Bank of Switzerland (UBS) in Zürich. He discovered that officials at UBS were destroying documents about orphaned assets, believed to be credit balances of deceased Jewish clients whose heirs' whereabouts were unknown, as well as books from the German Reichsbank. They listed stock accounts for companies in business during The Holocaust, including BASF, Degussa, and Degesch. They listed real-estate records for Berlin property that had been seized by the Nazis, placed in Swiss accounts, and then claimed to be owned by UBS. Destruction of such documents is against Swiss laws. The documents Meili saved reportedly predate the Nazi period, dating from 1897 to 1927. On 8 January 1997, he took some bank files home. After a telephone conversation, he handed them over to a local Jewish organization, which brought the documents to the police, and eventually to the press, which published the document destruction on 14 January 1997. The Zürich authorities opened a judicial investigation against Meili for suspected violations of the Swiss laws on banking secrecy, which is a prosecutable offense ex officio in Switzerland.

After Meili and his family reported receiving death threats, they fled to the United States and were granted political asylum via private bill. According to news reports, Meili and his family are believed to be the only Swiss nationals ever to receive political asylum in the United States. Since 11 August 1989, Meili has been married to Giuseppina Intelisano, a homemaker of Italian descent, and has been residing in Brugg, Switzerland. They had two children born in 1992 and 1994.

On 13 January 1998, lawyer Ed Fagan filed suit against UBS on behalf of the Jewish victims, in the amount of US$2,560,000,000. On 13 August 1998, a settlement was reached between the Swiss banks and the Jewish plaintiffs totaling US$1.25 billion. Fagan was disbarred in New York and New Jersey for failing to pay court fines and fees, and for stealing client money and escrow trust funds from Holocaust survivors. Later in 1998 the investigations of the justice of Zürich against Meili for allegedly breaking the laws on bank secrecy were cancelled, but Meili did not return to his homeland until 2003. His marriage ended in divorce in February 2002. In September 2003 he visited his family in Switzerland. In Die Weltwoche, a Swiss newspaper, Meili criticized Fagan for having purportedly "instrumentalized" him and letting him down. He claimed to have never received the US$1 million that he was due according to their agreement after settling with the Swiss banks in 1998. However, according to a report by the Swiss magazine Facts (17 March 2005), Meili did receive US$750,000.

Meili studied communication sciences at Chapman University after his arrival in California. After earning his college degree in May 2004, he found employment in the security sector. On 14 May 2005 he became a naturalized United States citizen. In an interview with the Swiss newspaper Sonntagsblick on 21 October 2006, however, Meili re-iterated his criticism of Fagan and the Jewish organizations who had once championed him, stating again they had let him down. Meili, who then lived in Southern California, stated in an interview that he was working for minimum wage. In 2009, divorced from his wife, Meili returned to Switzerland.

== Effect of whistleblowing ==
In his book Imperfect Justice, activist Stuart Eizenstat claimed the "Meili Affair" was important in the decision of Swiss banks to participate in the process of reparations for victims of Nazi looting during World War II. He wrote that the affair "did more than anything to turn the Swiss banks into international pariahs by linking their dubious behavior during and after the War to the discovery of a seemingly unapologetic attempt to cover it up now by destroying documents." Eizenstat indicates that the affair influenced the Swiss Bankers Association (SBA) decision to create a Humanitarian Fund for the Victims of the Holocaust, and that the Fund was suggested to the SBA by Rainer Gut, chairman of Credit Suisse. as well as one of a series of events influencing the London Conference on Nazi Gold (1997).

== Filmography ==
Daniel von Aarburg filmed the events, and the documentary Affäre Meili - Ein Whistleblower zwischen Moral und Milliarden premiered in mid-August 2018.

== Awards ==
- 1997 - Jan Zwartendijk Memorial Award for Humanitarian Values and Ethics from the Boys Town Jerusalem Foundation of America.
- 1998 - Grand Prize, Honest Abe Awards
- 1998 - Humanitarian Award, The 1939 Club (with Giusseppina Meili)
- 1999 - Seton Hall University's Humanitarian of the Year Award
- 1999 - Scholarship Fund, The 1939 Club
- 1999 - Humanitarian of the Year Award, Orange County, California.
