= World Jewish Congress lawsuit against Swiss banks =

Legal action by victims of Nazi persecution against banks of Switzerland

The World Jewish Congress lawsuit against Swiss banks was launched in 1995 to retrieve deposits made into the three largest Swiss banks (UBS, Credit Suisse and Swiss Bank Corporation) by victims of Nazi persecution during and before World War II. WJC negotiations were initiated with the Government of Switzerland and Swiss banks, and later expanded to cover Swiss insurance companies, over burdensome proof-of-ownership requirements for accounts and insurance policies. Strong support from both federal and state United States politicians and officials, threats of sanctions against the three Swiss banks, as well as leaked documents from a bank guard pressured a settlement of the suit in 1998 in a U.S. court for multiple classes of people affected by government and banking practices. The Swiss government itself was not a signatory to the deal.

As of early 2020, US$1.29 billion has been disbursed to approximately 458,400 claimants.

While lauded by many in the United States as a significant legal milestone for Holocaust justice, the settlement was controversial in Switzerland. Some commentators found it problematic that the amount of funds eventually disbursed significantly exceeded what was ultimately found in Swiss banks (as determined by the Volcker Commission) and that the final settlement was not based on an exact amount owed, but on a compromise between the World Jewish Congress and Swiss financial institutions amid the backdrop of the threat of U.S. sanctions against Switzerland. Others criticized the fact that, as per the terms of the settlements, the Swiss banks were also deemed financially accountable for profiting from the denial of entry of some Jews into Switzerland and for forced labor performed for the benefit of any Swiss corporation (not only banks) by Jewish refugees admitted during World War II, when decisions surrounding refugee policy and forced labor were never in the banks' purview. The Swiss government did not participate in the settlement.

== Historical background ==
Due to Switzerland's declared military neutrality in World War II, Swiss banks had been a safe haven for Jewish assets before and during the war. The Holocaust saw the genocide of approximately six million Jews, which included individuals who had deposited their funds into Swiss banks. Since the end of World War II, some individual heirs to depositors who were murdered reported difficulties in retrieving the funds because Swiss banks had asked for death certificates of the original depositors. However, the Nazis did not issue death certificates to those they murdered. Furthermore, some heirs to victims alleged that Swiss banks stonewalled them and deliberately misled them about the existence of an account. Swiss banking secrecy laws prevented bankers from answering questions about account holders to individuals they deemed had no evidence that they were connected to the original depositor. Any revealing of information could have led to a fine or imprisonment of the respective banker under the 1934 Swiss Federal Act on Banks.

=== Switzerland settles World War II claims: the 1946 Washington Agreement ===
In 1946, Switzerland and the Western allies signed the Washington Agreement in Washington, DC. Switzerland would pay 250 million Swiss francs toward Europe's reconstruction after the war. In return, the Allies waived further claims against the Swiss National Bank, whose activities during the war, such as purchasing German looted gold, were controversial. Switzerland would also be required to register the German assets blocked in Switzerland from February 16, 1945, and to liquidate the assets held in Switzerland by German citizens living in Germany. The United States unfroze Swiss assets, which it blocked in 1941 along with those of other neutral countries.

Further, the Swiss government pledged to show "goodwill" and explore the identification of any dormant assets belonging to Holocaust victims, in an unpublished letter that was a binding addendum to the agreement.

The relevance to the WJC lawsuit was that the Swiss government would state that all claims relating to heirless assets located in Switzerland as well as claims against the Swiss National Bank’s trade in Nazi gold, would have been settled by the Agreement and any addenda in 1946, making any further legal maneuvering against Swiss interests unnecessary. The World Jewish Congress, as well as several U.S. politicians disagreed, pointing to what they saw as new evidence of Swiss wartime collusion with the Nazis. From their perspective, this put into question the fairness of the Washington Agreement.

=== Switzerland signed treaties to trade dormant accounts for nationalization compensation ===
In 1949, Switzerland signed a treaty with then-communist Poland to trade Swiss bank accounts held by Polish depositors, from whom nothing had been heard since before World War II. This was in return for compensation for the nationalization of Swiss-owned assets in Poland with the emergence of Communist rule. The treaty contained a provision that if depositors or their heirs did emerge, the Polish government would be legally responsible to compensate them. The deal was controversial in Switzerland and abroad at the time, but it was based on Swiss law. The Federal law of June 25, 1891 "Concerning the Civil Law Situation of Settled and Temporary Residents" required dormant accounts of individuals who did not reside in Switzerland to be given to the government of the deceased’s last country of residency, where they were last tax-liable. The position taken by the Swiss Bankers Association, which backed the deal, was that depositors were responsible for understanding the laws of the banking jurisdictions to which they entrusted their money, which included unforeseen circumstances related to dormancy of accounts.

The names of the depositors whose accounts were handed over were not given to the Polish government, with the Swiss government citing fear for the safety of any remaining depositors or their heirs in a Communist regime. This proved controversial because it meant the Polish authorities, if they wanted to, were unable to compensate any depositors or heirs still alive.

The treaty, controversial when it was signed in 1949, caused further controversy when the World Jewish Congress mentioned it in 1996 as an example of Swiss Government and bank misconduct in the handling of dormant accounts. The WJC and the main backer of its lawsuit in the Senate, Sen. Alfonse D’Amato, described the deal as "secret" and that researchers "newly discovered it". The exchange of Polish-owned accounts for nationalization compensation of Swiss citizens was agreed upon in an addendum of an exchange of letters that was confidential at the time of signing and for months thereafter. The Swiss government, however, rejected the notion that a "secret deal" had been signed with Poland, citing the widespread press coverage (including in U.S. newspapers) in the aftermath of the confidential clauses eventually being revealed in 1949. Following the controversy caused by the deal’s rediscovery, historians Peter Hug and Marc Perrenoud were commissioned by the Swiss government in October of 1996 to complete a report using files held at the Swiss Federal Archives detailing what happened to the money given to Communist Poland. The report (written mostly in German and partially in French) confirmed that Switzerland had signed such deals with Poland and other communist Eastern European countries.

== Legal background ==
The plaintiffs filed their suits by invoking the 1789 Alien Tort Claims Act (ATCA), which allows for alleged human rights violations committed abroad, such as in Swiss territory, to be litigated in U.S. federal court if the violation of human rights violates well-established norms of international law and there is a sufficient connection to the United States.

To prove the suit's eligibility under the ATCA, the plaintiffs alleged that the Swiss banks committed human rights violations by knowingly abetting the Nazi government's financing of World War II operations, thereby prolonging the war by at least one year. They further alleged that the Swiss banks knowingly accepted assets looted from Holocaust victims and knowingly enriched themselves at the expense of Holocaust victims.

== Negotiations ==
Starting in 1995, the World Jewish Congress (WJC) began negotiations on behalf of various Jewish organizations with Swiss banks and the Swiss government over dormant Jewish World War II bank accounts. Led by Edgar Bronfman, the heir to the Seagram's fortune, the WJC entered a class-action in Brooklyn, New York City combining several established suits in New York, California, and the District of Columbia. The original suits arose from grievances of Holocaust survivors and their heirs against Swiss banks. They alleged improper difficulties in accessing these accounts because of requirements such as death certificates (typically non-existent for Holocaust victims), along with deliberate efforts on the part of some Swiss banks to retain the balances indefinitely. The causes for claims eventually expanded to include the value of art works purported to have been stolen, damages to persons denied admission to Switzerland on the strength of refugee applications, and the value or cost of labor performed by persons being maintained at Swiss government expense in displaced-person camps during the Holocaust, along with interest on such claims from the time of loss.

== Hearings ==
The WJC was able to marshal the unprecedented support of U.S. government officials including senator Alfonse D'Amato R-NY, who held hearings of the Senate Banking Committee in which he claimed to possess "recently declassified documents that shed new light" on the Swiss role in the war. He also claimed that "hundreds of millions of dollars" of war-era Jewish assets remained in Swiss banks.

At the behest of President Bill Clinton, Undersecretary of Commerce Stuart Eizenstat testified at these hearings and commissioned a report which accused Switzerland of being "Nazi Germany's banker". The report relied exclusively on U.S. government archives. It contained no new historical information on Nazi victims' deposits into Swiss banks, and criticized the decisions of U.S. officials who negotiated settlements with Switzerland after the war as being too lenient.

Christoph Meili, a Swiss bank guard, also testified at the hearings, claiming to have witnessed illegal shredding of wartime records at Union Bank of Switzerland (SBG/UBS) in January 1997. He removed wartime records of transactions with German companies and gave them to the Swiss-Israeli Cultural Association. A warrant was issued for his arrest for violation of banking secrecy laws, and he fled to the U.S. UBS stated the records were not relevant to dormant Jewish assets.

Other individuals who testified included British author Tom Bower, who had written a book titled Blood Money: The Swiss, the Nazis and the Looted Billions.

== US–Swiss tension ==
The hearings led to international friction between the US and Switzerland, with boycotts of Swiss companies and products threatened in several US states. In Switzerland, the most controversial contention of the Eizenstat report was that Switzerland assisted the Nazis beyond what was necessary for a neutral country, and prolonged the war. Swiss public opinion was overwhelmingly against any settlement. The banks' position was that the settlement demands were grossly out of proportion to the value of unclaimed assets, and the Swiss government's position was that negotiations relating to laundering of assets looted by the Nazis were settled during previous agreements with the Allied governments (such as the 1946 Washington Agreement) could not be reopened, because no new historical information had come to light.

Audits of dormant accounts ordered by the Swiss government in 1962 and 1995 showed $32 million (1995 dollars) in unclaimed war-era accounts. In 1997, the banks published a list of dormant accounts in newspapers abroad. Among the names, the American ambassador at the time, Zurich-born Madeleine Kunin, found Renee May, her mother, who died in 1970.

The WJC rejected a $600 million offer from the banks and demanded payment of $1.8 billion to settle the lawsuit. During the negotiations, the Swiss banks agreed to pay for another audit, headed by ex-Federal Reserve chairman Paul Volcker, of wartime accounts. This audit committee included three bank representatives and three from the Jewish groups. NY City Comptroller Alan G. Hevesi played a crucial role in the negotiations, convening a meeting in December 1997 with Swiss bank executives and Democratic Party state treasurers to discuss sanctions such as divesting state funds from Swiss banks and withholding licenses. Hevesi also withheld an operating license for the merger of Union Bank of Switzerland with Swiss Bank Corporation, which together made $4 billion in profits per year in New York City. Hevesi was joined by officials in other states, such as California’s State Treasurer Matt Fong, who in 1998 stopped all investments and deposits from California’s state fund in the U.S. subsidiaries of Credit Suisse, Swiss Bank Corporation, and the Union Bank of Switzerland.

The U.S. Federal Government, despite endorsing the WJC campaign in general terms, formally opposed any sanctions against Swiss banks, fearing negative effects on relations with Switzerland. In November 1997 the Swiss government began talks with federal U.S. trade representatives to ensure any local or state sanctions would not violate WTO General Agreement on Trade in Services (GATS) rules. A formal WTO complaint, which in the estimation of the Swiss Federal Council was an avenue worth exploring, was being considered. These efforts were revealed in June 1998, as part of the Swiss government’s response to a request for information from a member of the Swiss parliament.

American political scientist Angelo Codevilla argues that the threat of sanctions against the banks by state and city officials, with only placid opposition by the Clinton Administration, to force a settlement between the banks and the WJC, constituted blackmail. Other political scientists critical of the settlement include Norman Finkelstein, who devoted an entire chapter of his book The Holocaust Industry to the proceedings.

Negotiations involving the banks, the WJC, and Undersecretary Eizenstat ultimately resulted in a settlement of $1.25 billion in August 1998, agreed upon by the parties in front of Judge Edward Korman. The Swiss government refused to take part in the settlement, and started a CHF 300 million Special Fund for Holocaust Victims with the Swiss National Bank. It also commissioned an independent panel of international scholars known as the Bergier Commission to study the relationship between Switzerland and the Nazi regime.

== Volcker and Bergier commissions ==
The Volcker commission audit cost 300 million Swiss Francs, paid for by Swiss banks, and gave its final report in December 1999. It determined that the 1999 book value of all dormant accounts possibly belonging to victims of Nazi persecution that were unclaimed, closed by the Nazis, or closed by unknown persons was 95 million Swiss Francs. Of this total, 24 million Swiss Francs were "probably" related to victims of Nazi persecution. In addition the commission found "no proof of systematic destruction of records of victim accounts, organized discrimination against the accounts of victims of Nazi persecution, or concerted efforts to divert the funds of victims of Nazi persecution to improper purposes." It also "confirmed evidence of questionable and deceitful actions by some individual banks in the handling of accounts of victims".

The Volcker commission recommended that, for settlement purposes, the book values should be modified back to 1945 values (by adding back fees paid and subtracting interest) and then be multiplied by 10 to reflect average long-term investment rates in Switzerland. Under these rules, a total of $379.4 million was awarded to account holders or their heirs. In cases where the claimant could be verified but the size of the account could not be verified, a $125,000 award was given. The commission recommended that the remaining balance of the settlement should be given to other victims of Nazi persecution.

The Bergier Commission reached similar conclusions about the banks' conduct in its final report, and found that trade with Nazi Germany did not significantly prolong World War II. However, the Commission was highly critical of Swiss World War II policy in areas other than dormant accounts.

== Settlement ==
On November 22, 2000, Judge Edward R. Korman announced a settlement of this case with his approval of a plan featuring the payment of $1.25 billion into funds controlled by the Israeli Banking Trust. Judah Gribetz was appointed Special Master to administer the plan, which is sometimes called the Gribetz Plan after its chief author.

As of January 31, 2020, US$1.29 billion has been disbursed for approximately 458,400 claimants.

== Aftermath and effects ==
The plaintiffs' success in reaching a settlement inspired further lawsuits against foreign banks and corporate entities under the Alien Tort Claims Act. Ed Fagan, one of the main attorneys representing the plaintiffs in the WJC case against Swiss banks, would again file suit against Credit Suisse and UBS in 2002, this time on behalf of South African Apartheid victims. The case was later expanded to include more than 30 companies, including Nestle, Ford, Shell, ExxonMobil and Citigroup. He alleged that the corporations contributed to financing the South African Apartheid government, thereby contributing to and prolonging human rights violations. This case was dismissed by a U.S. federal judge in 2004.

Fagan would later be disbarred in multiple states due to failing to pay court fines and fees and for stealing client money and escrow trust funds from Holocaust survivors, some of whom he represented during the World Jewish Congress lawsuit.

Antisemitic incidents rose in Switzerland in the aftermath of the settlement.

== Effort to Reopen the Settlement ==
In July 2025, Bloomberg News reported investigators had uncovered documents that suggested Credit Suisse did not disclose billions of dollars of assets held in accounts owned by Nazis. Ron Lauder, Chairman of the World Jewish Congress and former Volcker Commission representative for the World Jewish Restitution Organization, said this money should have been part of the 1998 settlement. Lauder further told Bloomberg News UBS, which purchased Credit Suisse, could be liable for between $5 billion to $10 billion. UBS opened its own investigation, hiring Neil Barofsky to complete a report on the matter.

The U.S. Senate opened its own investigation, with hearings scheduled in February 2026. UBS executives Robert Karofsky and Babara Levi were called to testify. In advance, the World Jewish Congress issued a statement indicating it was reopening the settlement, saying UBS should offer full restitution for assets not disclosed in the original settlement. The WJC statement specifically cited UBS executives Colm Kelleher and Iqbal Khan. In testimony before the U.S. Senate, UBS executive Robert Karofksy said UBS would resist any effort to open the settlement or any effort for Barofsky to expand his investigation.

== See also ==
- Alperin v. Vatican Bank
- Bank secrecy
- Banking in Switzerland
- Gold laundering
- List of banks in Switzerland
  - Swiss National Bank (Switzerland's central bank)
  - UBS AG (Switzerland's largest bank)
- List of class action lawsuits
- Nazi gold
- Numbered bank account
- Private bank
- Switzerland during the World Wars
- World Jewish Congress
