= Richard J. Baer =

Swiss physicist (1892–1940)

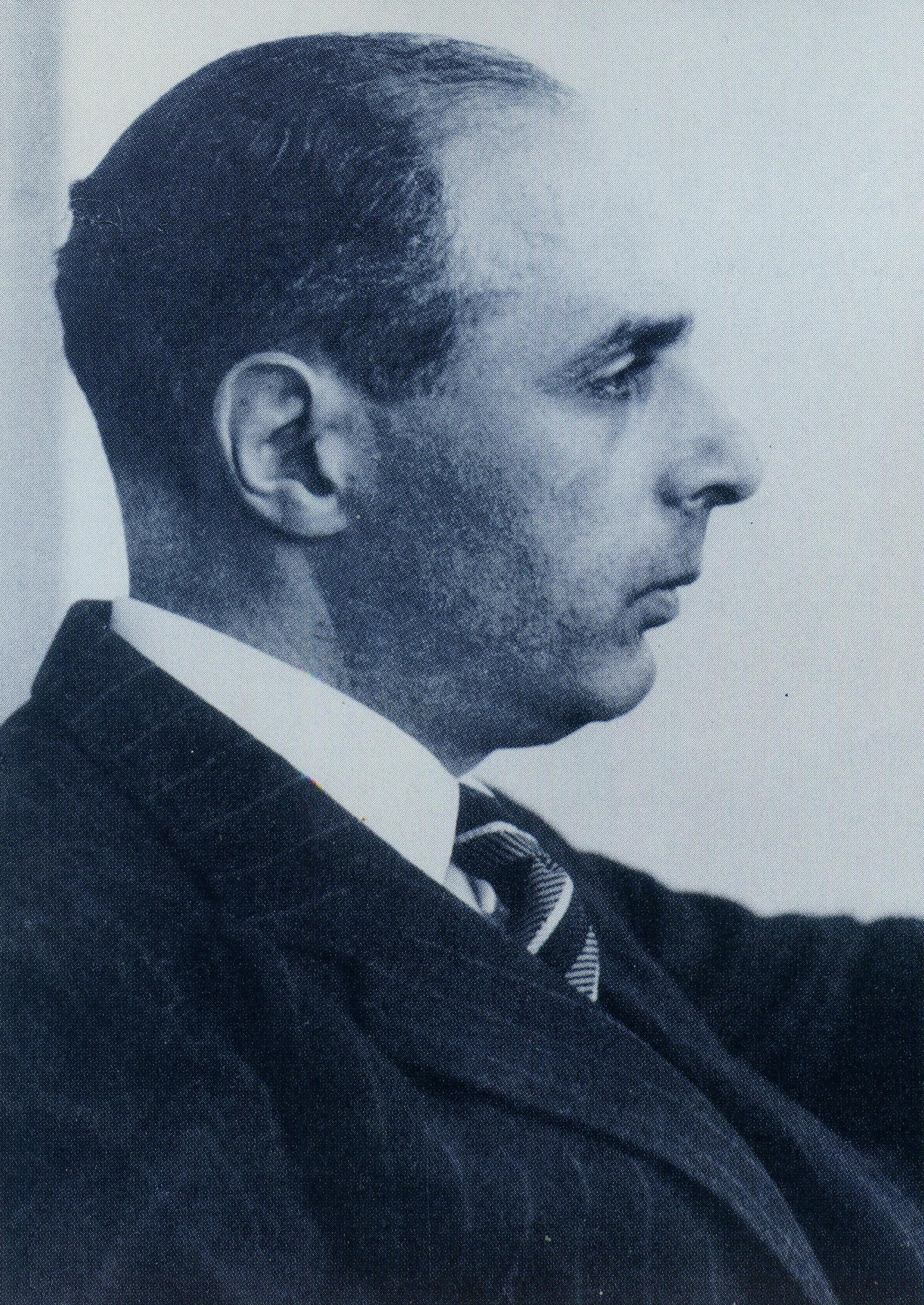
- Born: Richard Josef Baer; 11 September 1892; Basel, Switzerland
- Died: 13 December 1940 (aged 48); Zürich, Switzerland
- Occupations: Physicist, banker
- Years active: 1922–1940
- Employer: Julius Baer Group
- Spouse: Ellen Lohnstein (m. 1922)
- Children: 3, including Hans
- Parents: Julius Baer; Marie Ulrich Baer

Richard Josef Baer (11 September 1892 – 13 December 1940) was a Swiss physicist and banker who was a partner of Julius Baer Group between 1922 and 1940 (his death). Baer was the oldest son of Julius Baer and father to Hans J. Baer.

== Early life and education ==
Baer was born 11 September 1892 in Basel, Switzerland, the oldest of three sons, to Julius Baer, a German-Jewish banker originally from Heidelsheim (presently Bruchsal), and Marie Baer (née Ulrich; 1869–1917). His younger brothers were; Walter Jakob (1895-1970) and Werner Baer (1899-1960).

He was initially raised in Basel before his family relocated to Zurich in 1897. He completed his Matura in 1912 and then studied mathematics at the University of Würzburg. He returned to Switzerland as World War I broke out and completed his studies at the University of Zurich and ETH Zurich. Shortly thereafter he completed his PhD in Würzburg under Emil Hilb.

== Personal life ==
In August 1922, Baer married Ellen Lohnstein (1902-1998), a daughter of Ludwig Lohnstein (1872-1943) and Maria Lohnstein (née Kann; 1881-1955). His in-laws relocated to Geneva after World War II. They had four children;

- Marianne Baer (1923-2011), married Jorgen Likke Olson (1923-2006)
- Hans Julius Baer (1927-2011), long-term president and chairman of Julius Baer Group, married Ilse Kaelin (1920-2008); two children
- Ruth Irene Baer (born 1930), married to David Rudolf Speiser; four children
- Thomas August Baer (born 1937), an attorney in Erlenbach, married firstly to Heidi Wolff-Limper (born 1940), secondly to Monika Bettschart (born 1932); no children

Baer died 13 December 1940 aged 48, shortly before the family planned to emigrate to the United States. His family went to Princeton, New Jersey after his death arriving in May 1941. In 1950, his wife would remarry to fellow scientist Hermann Weyl.

== Literature ==
- Ernst Bieri, Peter Holenstein, Karl Völk: 1890–1990 – Eine Bank und ihre Familie – Eine Familie und ihre Bank, 352 Seiten, herausgegeben von der Bank Julius Bär, Zürich 1990, S. 84–89 (in German)
