= Georges Elhedery =

Lebanese banker

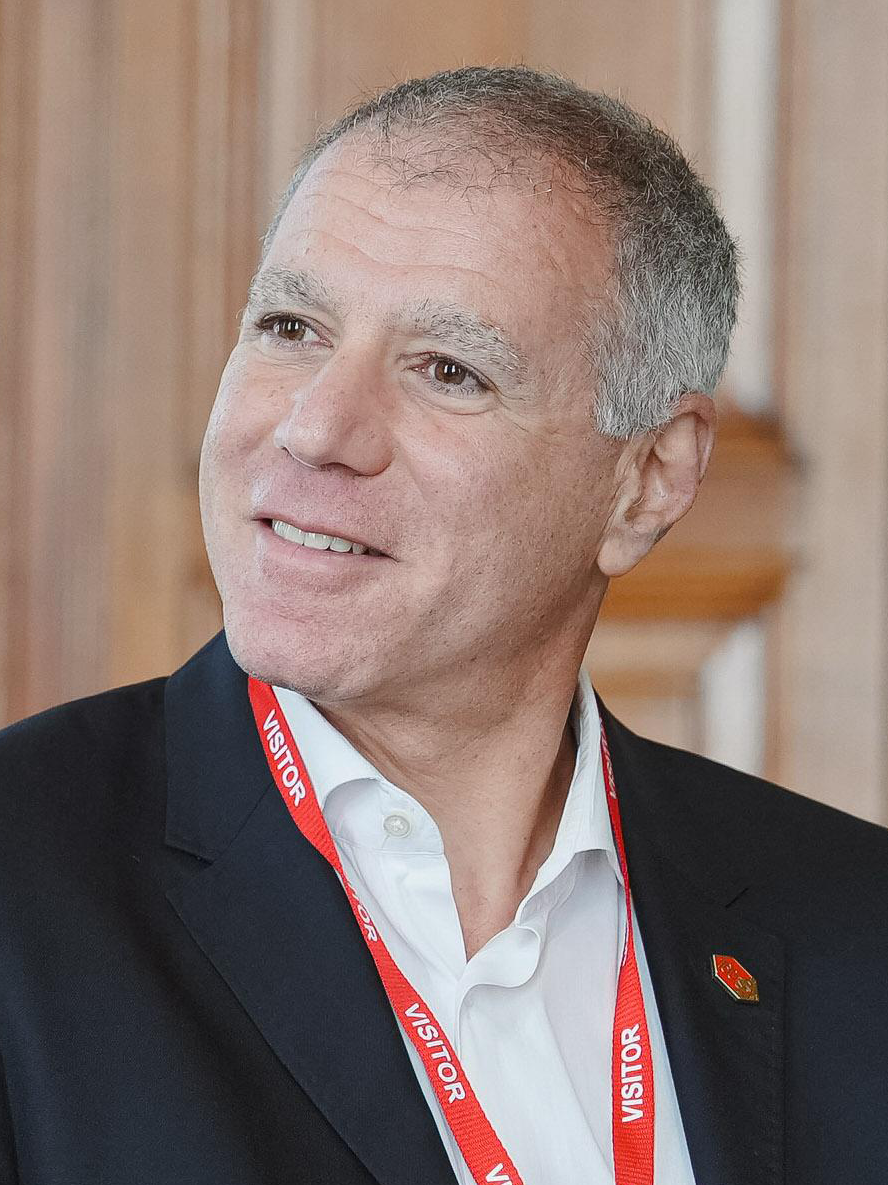
- Elhedery in 2025
- Born: c. 1974; Beirut, Lebanon
- Occupation: Banker
- Employer: HSBC
- Title: Group chief executive
- Term: September 2024–present
- Predecessor: Noel Quinn

Georges Elhedery (born c. 1974) is a banker born in Lebanon. A French national, Elhedery has been the group chief executive (CEO) of HSBC since September 2024, when he succeeded Noel Quinn.

== Early life and education ==
Elhedery was born c. 1974 in Beirut, Lebanon, and grew up during the Lebanese Civil War. His father was a banker, and his mother a teacher. He earned a degree in engineering at the École Polytechnique in Paris, followed by a postgraduate degree in statistics and economics from the École Nationale de la Statistique et de l'Administration Économique. He interned in Germany with Caisse des dépôts et consignations, a French public sector financial institution.

== Career ==
Elhedery began his career in banking with Banque Paribas in Tokyo in 1997. He then worked for Goldman Sachs from 2001 to 2005, before joining HSBC.

Elhedery was head of the bank in the Middle East, North Africa, and Turkey from 2016 to 2019. Elhedery, who speaks fluent Arabic, French, English, German, Spanish, and proficient Japanese, took a six-month sabbatical to learn Mandarin in 2022. He returned to HSBC as its chief financial officer from 2023 to 2024. Elhedery succeeded Noel Quinn as group CEO of HSBC in September 2024. Following his appointment, Elhedery restructured HSBC into four units and refocused its investment banking on Asia. As of February 2025, Elhedery was earning a total of $6.8 million in annual compensation from HSBC.
