= Thomas J. Biersteker =

American political scientist

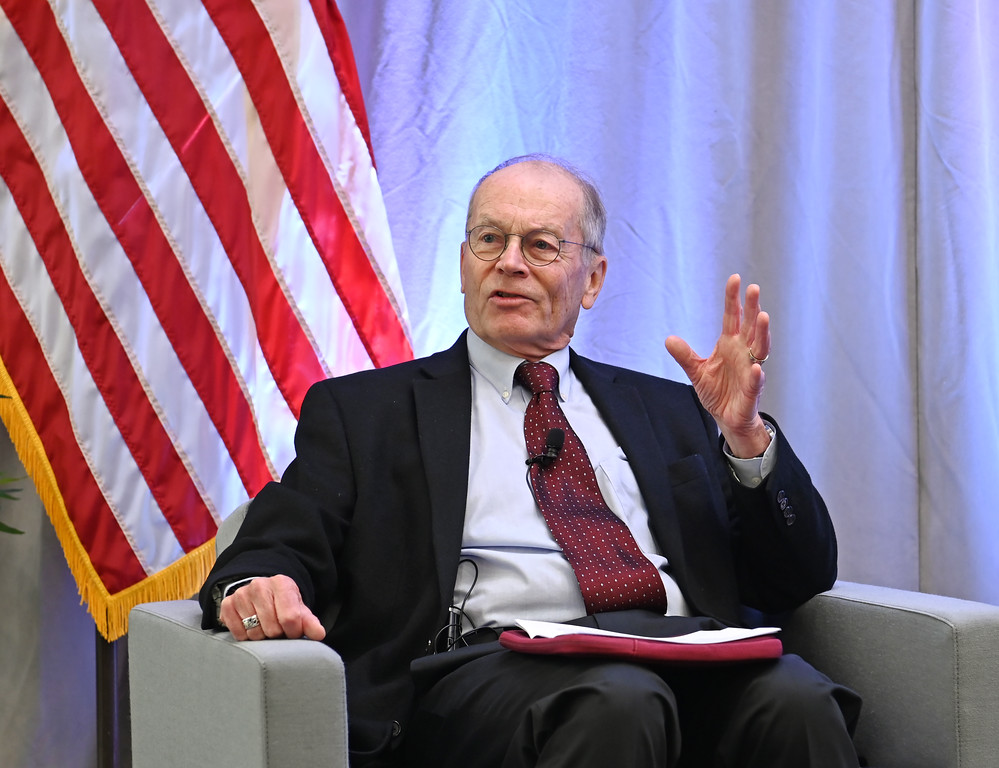
- Biersteker in 2023

Professor at Graduate Institute of International and Development Studies
- Incumbent
- Assumed office July 2007

Director of Watson Institute for International and Public Affairs, Brown University
- In office 1994–2006
- Preceded by: Vartan Gregorian (acting director of Watson Institute for International and Public Affairs after the death of Howard Swearer, president of Brown University)
- Succeeded by: Barbara Stallings

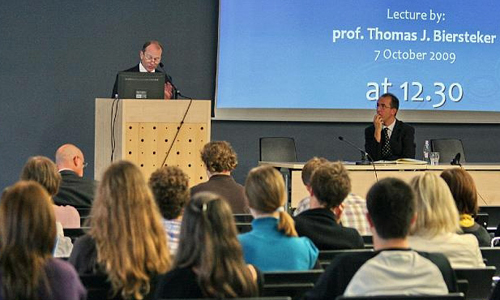
Biersteker giving lectures on the work of the UN Secretariat and governments on targeting sanctions, global governance and on challenges facing the UN Peace Building Commission

Thomas J. Biersteker is an American political scientist and a notable constructivism scholar. He became the first Curt Gasteyger Professor of International Security at the Geneva Graduate Institute, in Switzerland in 2007, where he is also a member of the Centre on Conflict, Development and Peacebuilding. He is an active member of the Council on Foreign Relations and the Social Science Research Council and is on the editorial board of Stability: International Journal of Security and Development. His more recent work included advising the United Nations’ Secretariat and the governments of Switzerland, Sweden and Germany on the design of targeted sanctions. In 2020, he was awarded the University of Chicago Professional Achievement Award.

== Education ==
Biersteker received a PhD from the Massachusetts Institute of Technology, Department of Political Science in February 1977, from where he had received an M.S. in February 1975. His A.B. degree was from the University of Chicago, Public Affairs Program in June 1972. His PhD dissertation won the 1978 Helen Dwight Reid Award from the American Political Science Association for best dissertation in International Relations.

== Career ==
Prior to the Graduate Institute, he served as Director of the Watson Institute for International Studies at Brown University 1994–2006). He was the Olive C. Watson Professor of International Studies at the Watson Institute for International Studies, and earlier the Henry R. Luce Professor of Transnational Organizations in the Department of Political Science at Brown University, from 1992 to 2006. He was a professor at the School of International Relations, University of Southern California from 1985 to 1992, where he was founder and Director of the Center for International Studies. He was an associate professor in the Department of Political Science at Yale University, where he taught from 1976 to 1985.

== Research ==
Biersteker's research interests focus on governance, the history of international relations, international political economy, targeted sanctions, international organizations, diplomacy, peacekeeping, state-building and terrorism.

Biersteker is the coordinator of the Geneva International Sanctions Network (GISN), an academic platform based at the Graduate Institute focused on the study of targeted sanctions and their effectiveness in international governance.

He has written or co-authored a dozen scholarly books, including the following:

- Countering the Financing of Global Terrorism with Sue Eckert (New York and London: Routledge Publishers, ISBN 978-0-415-39643-1, 2007),
- The Emergence of Private Authority in Global Governance, with Rodney B. Hall (Cambridge: Cambridge University Press, 2002),
- Argument without End: In Search of Answers to the Vietnam Tragedy with Robert McNamara (8th United States Secretary of Defense), James G. Blight, Robert K. Brigham, and Col. Herbert Y. Schandler (New York: PublicAffairs Press, 1999),
- Distortion or Development? Contending Perspectives on the Multinational Corporation (Cambridge, MA: The MIT Press, 1978),
- State Sovereignty As Social Construct, with Cynthia Weber (Cambridge: Cambridge University Press, 1996).

He has written many peer-reviewed journal articles, book chapters, and policy papers. Among the more influential are:

- "The “Peculiar Problems” of Scholarly Engagement in the Policy Process," International Studies Review (2008),
- "A Comparative Assessment of Saudi Arabia with other Countries of the Islamic World," published in An Update on the Campaign Against the Financing of Terrorism, New York: Council on Foreign Relations (2004),
- "Reducing the role of the state in the economy: a conceptual exploration of IMF and World Bank prescriptions" in International Studies Quarterly (1990),
- "Critical Reflections on Post-Positivism in International Relations," International Studies Quarterly (1989),
- "The Dialectics of World Order: Notes for a future archaeologist of international savoir faire," co-authored with Hayward R. Alker, Jr., International Studies Quarterly (1984).
