= Curt Gasteyger =

Swiss legal scholar (1929–2020)

Curt Walter Gasteyger (born 20 March 1929 in Zurich, died 14 July 2020 in Geneva) was a Swiss legal scholar who specialised in questions of international security and disarmament.

== Life ==
Gasteyger was the Director of the Association for the Promotion and Study of International Security (APESI), and Honorary Professor at the Graduate Institute of International Studies (HEI), Geneva. He was the Professor for International Relations at the HEI from 1974 to 1994. He was also the founder and director of the Programme for Strategic and International Security Studies.

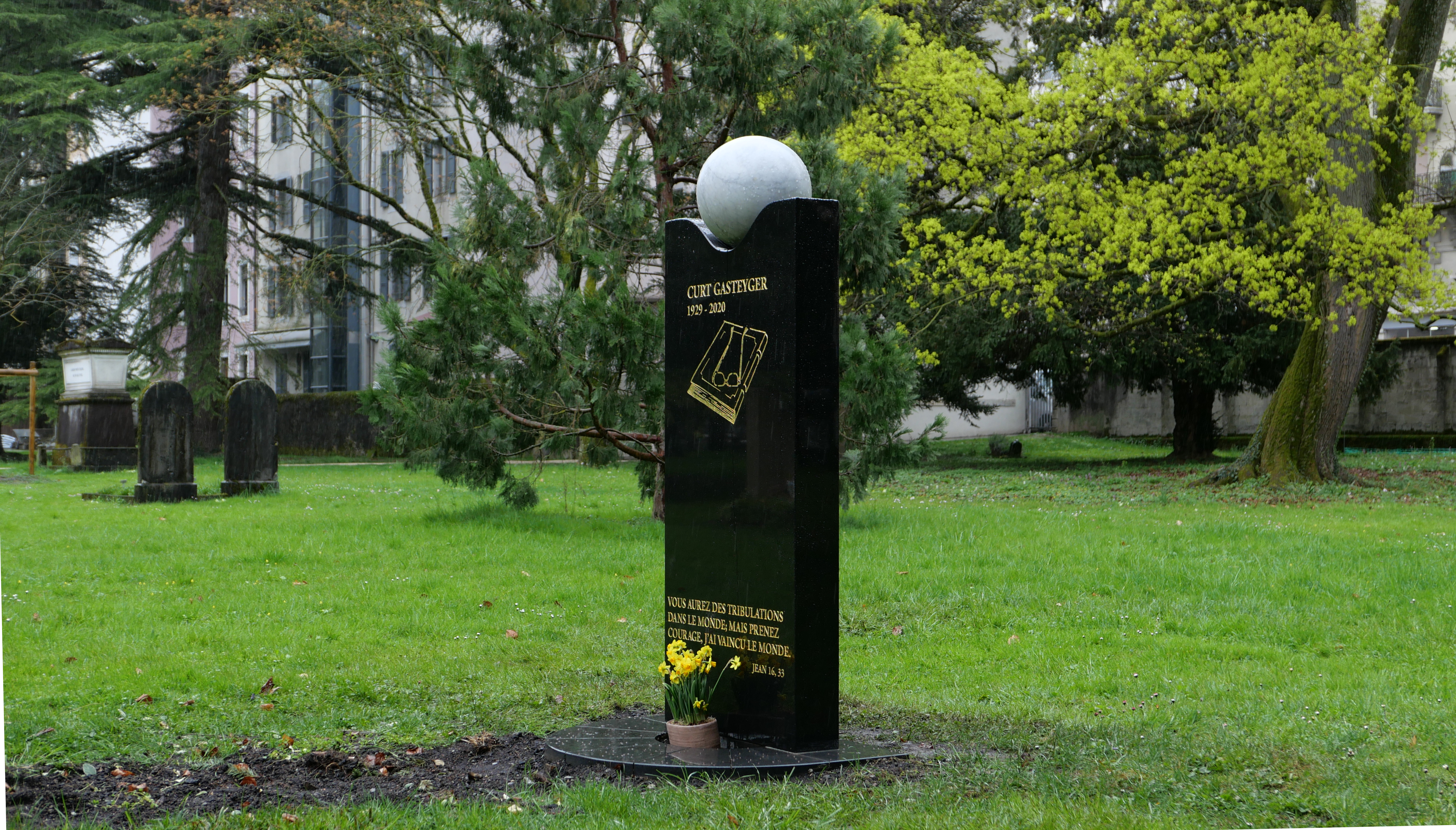
Gasteyger's grave

Gasteyger participated in the Volcker Commission, established to investigate the many dormant accounts opened by Jews fleeing Nazi persecution in Swiss Banks.

In 2003, he was awarded the Great Cross of Merit of the Federal Republic of Germany (Bundesverdienstkreuz).

In 2005, the HEI created the Gasteyger Chair in International Security and Conflict Studies in Gasteyger's honour, after a large donation from APESI. The first professor to hold the chair was Thomas J. Biersteker.

Gasteyer is buried at the Cimetière des Rois (Cemetery of Kings), which is considered the Genevan Panthéon.
