= Ed Fagan =

American disbarred reparations lawyer

Edward Davis Fagan
- Born: October 20, 1952; Harlingen, Texas, United States
- Education: Cardozo School of Law
- Occupation: Lawyer
- Known for: Holocaust reparations litigation
- Criminal charge: Disbarment for professional misconduct
- Children: 2

Edward Davis Fagan (born October 20, 1952, Harlingen, Texas) is a former American reparations lawyer who was disbarred for his conduct involving dishonesty, fraud, deceit, or misrepresentation.

Fagan was raised in San Antonio, Texas. He participated in the Yom Kippur War in Israel. After graduating from Cardozo School of Law in 1980, he initially worked as a personal injury lawyer and later with a law firm representing corporate defendants. In the 1980s, he founded an exploration club for the wealthy, organizing trips to exotic locations accompanied by scientists and environmentalists.

Fagan gained attention for filing lawsuits against Swiss banks in 1995, seeking reparations for Holocaust victims. Critics accused him of prioritizing personal gain and failing to adequately represent his clients. Fagan faced controversies in other cases, such as the 2002 slavery class action lawsuit and 2005 Kaprun disaster lawsuit.

Fagan lost his license in both New York and New Jersey for failing to pay court fines, and stealing client money and escrow trust funds from Holocaust survivors, some of whom he represented in the 1996-98 World Jewish Congress-initiated lawsuit against Swiss banks. Bankruptcy proceedings in 2007 revealed significant financial troubles, with debts said to be $9.4m.

== Background ==
Fagan was born in Harlingen, Texas, and raised in a Conservative Jewish home in San Antonio, Texas and has two children. Before embarking on his legal career, he traveled to Israel to take part in the Yom Kippur War. After returning to the US, he enrolled in Cardozo School of Law and graduated in 1980. He initially worked as a personal injury lawyer, then worked with a large law firm, representing corporate defendants, before he started an exploration club for the wealthy in the 1980s, allowing rich customers to visit exotic locations, entertained and accompanied by scientists and environmentalists. A nonprofit venture of the business, the Odyssoe Foundation, was created in 1991, but collapsed with the entire enterprise.

Clients and partners have stated publicly and in court that Fagan often failed to represent the interests of his clients, generally took on "too many clients", "vastly outstrip[ed] his resources" and was "often absent for the legal fight". According to Burt Neuborne, law professor at New York University, who had worked with Fagan before breaking with him, "Mr. Fagan's filing in the Swiss banks case was so inadequate that a judge asked him to rewrite it...This was an ordinary man who got swept up in issues that were bigger than he was."

== Career ==
=== 1995 Holocaust lawsuits against Swiss banks ===
In the 1995, Fagan filed lawsuits against three Swiss banks that had refused to release funds they held that belonged to Holocaust victims. The banks in question settled the claims outside of court, resulting in a payout of US$1.25 billion.

According to news reports Fagan held up the final formal signing of the German slave labor settlement because he wanted more money for himself. While several hundred people and German and American representatives waited, Fagan, still wearing an ABCNEWS 20/20 microphone, could be heard "haggling over the fees, and then boasting of his success". He was recorded saying "I got the legal fees up..We did great, we did great we just got another, we just got some more money."

Among Fagan's many critics was New York University law professor Burt Neuborne, who had said on record: "We essentially worked around him...I mean, he was, he was there, but, but he played, if I tell you zero, I mean zero role in developing the legal theory, in presenting the legal theory, and in participating as a lawyer." Neuborne, a leading human rights lawyer, believed that it was time to set the record straight:

It didn't surprise me at the last minute that the only lawyer, the only lawyer that thought he could hold this deal up would be Ed Fagan. Because that's the barometer of how much you care about yourself, and how much you care about those victims. I think it is appropriate to, to tell the truth about him. One hundred percent of his activity in this case, including the press activity, it was designed to get his name there so other people would sign up with him, so he could get more and more and more and more people in the fold and then show up in court and say "I am the top lawyer cause I have got the most clients."

In 1998, Gizella Weisshaus, the named plaintiff in the lawsuit against Swiss banks, opted out of that historic settlement because she felt that her attorneys were more interested in paying themselves millions of dollars, even before some of the survivors had received any money. On April 8, 1998, Weisshauss filed an attorney ethics complaint, claiming that Fagan, her lawyer at the time, held back $82,583.04 (~$163,126 in 2025) belonging to her from the estate of her deceased cousin Jack Oestreicher. Hal R. Lieberman, from Departmental Disciplinary Committee, Supreme Court, Appellate Division, responded on May 6, 1998, that in this "ongoing criminal proceeding" the outcome of the disciplinary investigation should be awaited.

In 2000, Fagan represented some 82,000 Holocaust victims and family members (many of whom later accused him of negligence), suing governments and companies in Germany and Austria based on the Alien Tort Claims Act.

=== 2002 slavery class action lawsuit ===
In April 2002, Fagan filed a class action lawsuit against eighteen companies, including FleetBoston, CSX Corporation, Aetna, Union Pacific Railroad, R.J. Reynolds Tobacco Company and Lehman Brothers, accusing the companies to have "unjustly enriched (themselves) through profits earned either directly or indirectly from the Trans-Atlantic slave trade and slavery between 1619 and 1865, as well as post-Emancipation slavery through the 1960s". In January 2004, Judge Charles R Norgle dismissed the lawsuit because Fagan failed to establish a clear link between plaintiffs and the companies.

=== 2002 apartheid lawsuit against Swiss and U.S. banks ===
According to news reports by CNN, the "maverick lawyer" attempted to file a $50 billion class action lawsuit against Swiss-based UBS and Credit Suisse and U.S.-based Citicorp Inc. for providing funds to the South African apartheid government during 1985 and 1993. Swiss Foreign Ministry spokesman Ruedi Christen dismissed the lawsuit with the following words: "It's another unjust attack against Switzerland," an opinion shared in Switzerland, where citizens told Fagan to "Go home!" and "Wash your dirty linen elsewhere", when he held a news conference on Zurich's Paradeplatz, home of the two biggest banks of Switzerland: Credit Suisse and UBS.

=== 2003 apartheid lawsuit against Anglo American ===
In 2003, Fagan and South African law firm Ngcebetsha Madlanga Attorneys attempted to sue Anglo American, the world's second-biggest mining company, diamond producer De Beers, Sasol Ltd., which supplies about 44% of South Africa's motor fuel, and Fluor Corporation, a California-based engineering company, claiming that the companies profited from South Africa's racial discrimination policies that ended in 1994. The claims were dismissed by a federal district judge in November 2004, and Fagan was not allowed to represent the case.

=== 2004 artwork lawsuit against Bank Austria Creditanstalt AG ===
In 2004, Fagan filed a federal lawsuit in Manhattan for a non-existent group called the Association of Holocaust Victims for Restitution of Artwork & Masterpieces (AHVRAM) against Bank Austria Creditanstalt AG and other European corporate, governmental and financial institutions for $6.8 billion. The lawsuit alleged the theft of artworks and other property during World War II's Holocaust, but was dismissed by U.S. District Court Judge Shirley Wohl Kram on August 19, 2005, because Fagan failed to state any basis for federal court jurisdiction of the "frivolous" and "bad faith" lawsuit. Kram noted that the "plaintiff organization AHVRAM did not exist," Fagan's "lack of preparation and professionalism, his 'glaringly inadequate filings,' and the fact that he deceived the court". Fagan's failure to pay the more than $350,000 (~$513,105 in 2025) in fines and litigation costs to the Bank Austria Creditanstalt AG led to his bankruptcy and disbarment.

=== 2004 slave trade lawsuit against Lloyd's of London ===
In the same year, Fagan unsuccessfully sued Britain's Lloyd's of London for insuring slave ships involved in the transatlantic slave trade. Fagan's inclusion of demands for financial compensation in his lawsuit was criticized by Kofi Mawuli Klu, the chairman of the Pan-Afrikan Taskforce for Internationalist Dialogue (PATFID); the Anti-Slavery Abolitionist Heritage Learning Movement and member of the Pan-Afrikan Reparations Coalition in Europe (PARCOE): "We have to make sure that the focus does not shift from the broad, deeper understanding of reparations to just one of financial compensation...We see action for reparations more as an educational issue of bringing masses of people into the fight against racism."

=== 2005 Kaprun disaster lawsuit ===
Fagan attempted to represent the plaintiffs in a suit brought by relatives of six Americans who were among the 155 people killed in the Kaprun disaster in Austria. However, in August 2007, Southern District of New York Judge Shira Scheindlin disqualified Fagan from representing the plaintiffs, noting that he had filed for personal bankruptcy, had a personal interest in the litigation's outcome and made false representations to the court. Scheindlin fined him $5,000.

=== 2005 Indian Ocean tsunami victims lawsuit ===
In 2005, he initiated a lawsuit on behalf of 2004 Indian Ocean earthquake victims. The lawsuit was directed against the Thai government, the US National Oceanic and Atmospheric Administration, and the French hotel group Sofitel for insufficient quake and tsunami warnings.

=== 2006 Borat lawsuit ===
In 2006, Fagan initiated legal proceedings, suing the makers of the film Borat: Cultural Learnings of America for Make Benefit Glorious Nation of Kazakhstan for $30 million (~$46 million in 2025) in damages on behalf of two inhabitants of the Romanian village of Glod, Dâmbovita for human rights violations. He planned to submit lawsuits in New York and Florida state courts, as well as in Frankfurt, Germany. Fagan said that he hoped to "teach Hollywood a very expensive lesson". The lawsuit was thrown out by U.S. District Judge Loretta Preska in a hearing in early December 2006 on the grounds that the charges were too vague to stand up in court. Fagan planned to refile.

== Malpractice ==
Fagan has been accused of abandoning personal injury clients in favor of the more lucrative Holocaust reparations cases. One personal injury client sued Fagan, and won a $3.2 million malpractice award. Fagan has been accused of having wasted over $500,000 of his clients' money.

In 1998, Judge Sterling Johnson Jr. of Federal District Court dismissed the federal lawsuit of Mr. Ortiz, noting that Fagan, his attorney, had "failed to prosecute" it for three years and had ignored court orders. The lawsuit of Ortiz, then a 49-year-old truck driver involved in a traffic accident, started in 1994, when Fagan filed a $35 million lawsuit on his behalf in federal court in Brooklyn and State Supreme Court, but Fagan failed to pursue the case after 1996. After that, Fagan did not see, visit, or speak with his client.

In another case, Fagan failed to submit a claim for Tom Giron to a New York state fund that compensates victims of uninsured motorists. Giron was struck and severely injured in 1992 by a car reported stolen, but did not receive any compensation, because, according to Jeffrey Rubinton, the fund's president, a claim was never filed and "its records showed that such an action had not been pursued and that the statute of limitations on making one had long expired." Another client, Offer Salmoni, won a $167,000 malpractice judgment against Fagan, because Fagan repeatedly failed to make court appearances in his eviction case, and so the statute of limitations expired without refiling.

New Jersey ethics officials filed a misconduct complaint before a grievance committee against Fagan on behalf of Diane Gibbons, another former client, who complained that Fagan failed to submit required papers in her personal injury case, leading to its dismissal. During the proceedings Fagan was forced to admit that he failed to withdraw from suits that he could not pursue, excusing himself with the words: "I was in over my head a lot of the time."

== Sexual misconduct investigation ==
The Jewish Daily The Forward reported in October 2005 that Fagan was engaged in a legal investigation about published accusations and sexual contacts with underage prostitutes in Austria. Austrian print and broadcast media reported that the state prosecutor in Vienna is looking into Fagan's contact with a prostitution ring that involved underage girls from Eastern Europe. Fagan confirmed the sexual contacts with a 17-year-old Lithuanian prostitute named Inga but claims that he believed the prostitute to be at least 22 years old. Although prostitution is regulated in Austria, it is still illegal to knowingly hire a prostitute under the age of 18. The maximum sentence, according to § 207b (Sexual abuses of adolescents) of the Austrian Strafgesetzbuch (criminal law) is 3 years of imprisonment.

== Disbarment in New Jersey and New York ==
In 2005, Fagan became the subject of an ethics investigation by the New Jersey Office of Attorney Ethics, accusing him of "knowing misappropriation" of client money. On April 2, 2007, Appellate Division, 1st Department held that Fagan had "violated a number of disciplinary rules prohibiting an attorney from disregarding a court's rulings, engaging in conduct involving dishonesty, fraud, misrepresentation or deceit, and acquiring a proprietary interest in the subject of the litigation."

On December 11, 2008, in the "Matter of Edward D. Fagan, M-2732, M-3148, M-3193", a unanimous panel of the Appellate Division, 1st Department, ruled, that Fagan's failure to pay sanctions and money owed to Bank Austria, his "pattern of prior sanctions for unprofessional conduct" and his "lack of contrition" made him unfit to practice law. Fagans will be "stricken from the roll of attorneys and counselors-at-law in the State of New York." The following day, Fagan was disbarred in New York for failing to pay a court fine and fees due to Bank Austria.

Following the 2008 recommendation of a special ethics master, the state disciplinary board of New Jersey decided in January 2009 that Fagan should be disbarred and banned from practicing in the state because he misappropriated hundreds of thousands of dollars entrusted to him by Holocaust survivors.

== Bankruptcy ==
Fagan's finances and businesses started to collapse in the 1990s. According to public records and newspaper articles Fagan began to owe large amounts of federal income taxes. In 1996 the Nynex Corporation filed a $228,000 lawsuit against Odyssoe in a New Jersey court for unpaid advertisements services, a bill that was, according to a spokeswoman for Verizon, the successor to Nynex, not even paid in 2000. Facing an eviction proceeding for unpaid rent, Fagan was forced in 1997 to abandon his offices and rent space from a law firm in the World Trade Center.

In 2005, Fagan had 28 outstanding court awards and liens of more than $4 million against him and his firm, Fagan & Associates, including three from clients who alleged that he neglected their cases. In February 2007, he filed for protection under federal bankruptcy laws in Tampa, Florida. Court documents are said to show that he owes about $9.4 million to creditors.

== See also ==
- List of disbarments in the United States
- Christoph Meili
- Holocaust industry
