= London Conference on Nazi Gold =

The London Conference on Nazi Gold was an international conference held in London in December 1997. Representatives of 41 nations participated in the Conference, including France, the United Kingdom, the United States, the three countries from the World War II Allies that fought Nazi Germany and the Axis powers that oversaw the post-War disposition of Nazi gold.

The Conference addressed the disposition of the remaining reserves of recovered Nazi gold held by the Tripartite Commission for the Restitution of Monetary Gold, a.k.a. the Tripartite Gold Commission. Nazi Germany looted approximately US$580 million of gold from the central banks of 15 countries (equivalent to approximately $10.37 billion in today's funds).

== Meili Affair ==
The London conference was called in the wake of the Meili affair that exposed the cover-up of Swiss banks participation in laundering Nazi assets. The conference was the idea of Holocaust Educational Trust Chairman Greville Janner, M.P., the chair of the All-Party Parliamentary Group against Anti-Semitism, and supported by Robin Cook and the incoming Blair government. Cook was appointed Foreign Secretary in the new government. The Blair government believed the conference was auspicious as the Commission was due to wind down. France and the United States supported the idea.

The London conference was called by France, the United Kingdom and the United States to consider their proposal to establish a fund to help needy Holocaust victims and their survivors, to be financed by the remaining reserves of Nazi gold. The original proposal made to the claimant countries was that the fund which focus on Holocaust victims located in the former communist states of Eastern Europe as they had not participated in reparations that had been made available to victims who lived in the west.

Because of the break-up of the Czechoslovakia and Yugoslavia, the original 10 claimant countries had swelled to 15. Six non-governmental organizations (NGOs), including the International Romany Union and five NGOs which represented Jews, participated in the conference.

== Tripartite Gold Commission ==
Headquartered in Brussels, the Tripartite Gold Commission ("The Commission") was a panel established in September 1946 by France, the United Kingdom and the United States and to recover gold stolen by Nazi Germany from other nations and eventually return it to the rightful owners. After recovering gold and receiving claims for it from 10 countries, the Commission found that it had insufficient resources to pay back all of the countries in full. Thus, each country received about 65% of its claim from the gold reserves recovered by the Commission.

The gold looted by the Nazis did not just come from central banks, but from individuals, including Holocaust victims who died in concentration camps. The Nazis not only confiscated their personal gold assets such as jewelry, but harvested gold from the teeth of their victims.

It is generally believed that Nazi Germany had gone through its own gold reserves by the start of World War II, and gold possessed and sold by the Germans after 1939 was war booty. The Nazis used neutral countries, including Portugal, Sweden and Switzerland, to sell their looted gold. Looted gold frequently was melted down and given a Reichsbank marque with a fake pre-war date stamp on the bars.

In the post-war period, the Commission decided segregated gold that had indubitably been harvested from Holocaust victims from Nazi gold in bar-form. The gold from victims was dedicated to funding services for them. The Commission also declared that all gold bars would be treated as monetary gold and considered as war booty looted from central banks. The bar gold would be distributed to the ten nations making claims. The Commission also ruled that it would not consider claims from individuals due to the fact that there would be too many claims to deal with. The Commission mandated that individual claims should be adjudicated by national governments.

== Fund for Needy Victims ==
By 1997, the Commission still held two percent of the original pool of approximately 337 tonnes of Nazi gold, five-and-a-half tonnes of gold worth a little less than $70 million ($198,374,341 in today's funds). At the London conference, the Commission formally took the stand that these countries that received Nazi gold contribute their portions of remaining assets to Holocaust survivors. The Commission completed its work and was formally dissolved on 9 September 1998 in the wake of the London Conference.
