= Rainer Gut =

Swiss manager (1932–2023)

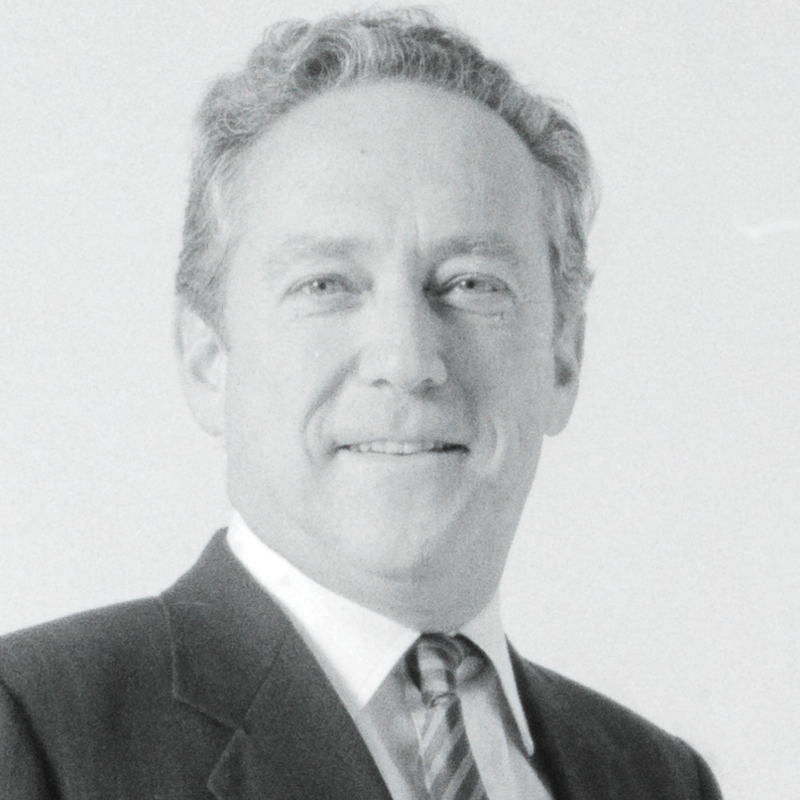
- Gut c. 1990s
- Born: Rainer Emil Gut; September 24, 1932; Baar, Switzerland
- Died: October 11, 2023 (aged 91)
- Occupation: Banker
- Known for: Former Chairman of Credit Suisse
- Spouse: Josephine Lorenz (m. 1957)
- Children: 4

Rainer Emil Gut colloquially Rainer E. Gut (24 September 1932 – 11 October 2023) was a Swiss banker and executive who most prominently served as Chairman of Credit Suisse (formerly SKA). His net worth was estimated at $140 million (2023) by Bilanz magazine.

== Early life and education ==
Gut was born 24 September 1932 in Baar near Zug, Switzerland, the fourth of five children, to Emil Gut (1896–1967), a bank director, and Rosa Gut (née Müller). His siblings were; Beatrice Gasser (née Gut), Esther Wettach (née Gut), Günther Gut and Firmin Gut.

He attended schools in Zug, London, and Paris.

== Career ==
In 1968 he became a general partner at Lazard Frères & Co., New York and in 1971 president and CEO of Swiss American Corporation in New York, a U.S. investment banking subsidiary of the then SKA (Schweizerische Kreditanstalt, now Credit Suisse). In 1973 he was a member of the Executive Board and from 1977 he acted as spokesman for "Schweizerische Kreditanstalt" (SKA), of which he became chairman in 1982.

From 1983 to 2000 he was chairman of the Board of Directors of SKA and Credit Suisse respectively, and between 1986 and 2000 also chairman of the Board of Directors of Credit Suisse Group (formerly CS Holding). From 2000 to 2005, he served as chairman of Nestlé S.A.. He held directorships with several international corporations, including Alusuisse, Bayer, Swiss Re, Swissair, Daimler Chrysler Switzerland, Ciba Geigy/Novartis, Elektrowatt, and Sulzer. Gut was honorary chairman of Credit Suisse Group from 2000 until 2023.

Under Gut's leadership, SKA developed into a leading international financial services group with a focus on investment banking, asset management, and insurance. In the Holocaust debate of the 1990s about dormant assets, he was committed to the creation of a humanitarian fund by the Swiss business community. Thanks in large part to Gut, the settlement between the Swiss banks and the Jewish plaintiffs in New York was reached in 1998.

== Personal life ==
In 1957, Gut married American-born Josephine "José" Lorenz (1930–2025), a daughter of John Lorenz and Claire Lorenz (née Harrington), both of Detroit, Michigan. They had four children;

- Nicole Gut
- Jeannine Gut
- Rainer Alexander Paul Gut, colloquially Alexander Gut (born 1963).
- Michael "Mike" Gut, who is a restaurateur in Zurich.

In the 1960s, the family resided in New York City, where at least the youngest sons were born. In 1973, they relocated to Bassersdorf for several decades and later to Maur. In 2019 his wealth was estimated at CHF 125 million by the business magazine Bilanz.

Gut died on 11 October 2023, at the age of 91.

== Literature ==
- Rainer E. Gut Historical Dictionary of Switzerland
- Vorabdruck Rainer E. Gut: Swiss-Geburtshelfer wider Willen Handelszeitung, Zürich 2003, ISBN 3-909267-04-1
- Vorabdruck Rainer E. Gut, Teil 2: Abenteuer First Boston Handelszeitung, Zürich 2003, ISBN 3-909267-04-1
- Vorabdruck Rainer E. Gut, Teil 3: Meister des Networking Handelszeitung, Zürich 2003, ISBN 3-909267-04-1
- Rainer E. Gut die kritische Größe (Memento of 19 October 2007 in the Internet Archive) Neue Zürcher Zeitung (NZZ) ISBN 978-3-03823-397-8
