= Noel Quinn =

British banking businessman (born 1962)

Sir Noel Quinn
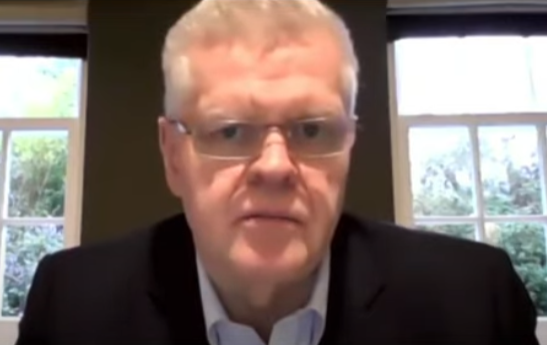
- Quinn in 2021

HSBC Chief Executive Officer
- In office 2019–2024
- Preceded by: John Flint
- Succeeded by: Georges Elhedery

Julius Baer Chairman
- In office 2025-
- Preceded by: Romeo Lacher

Personal details
- Born: Noel Paul Quinn; 13 January 1962 (age 64) England
- Spouse: Married
- Children: 3
- Education: Birmingham Polytechnic
- Occupation: Banker

Sir Noel Paul Quinn (born 13 January 1962) is a British banker who was group chief executive of HSBC from March 2020 to September 2024, having first been appointed interim chief executive in August 2019.

== Early life and education ==
Quinn studied at Birmingham Polytechnic and trained as a chartered accountant with Grant Thornton.

== Career ==
Quinn joined Forward Trust Group, a subsidiary of Midland Bank, in 1987. Midland Bank was acquired by HSBC in 1992. He led HSBC’s acquisitions of Swan National Motor Finance and Eversholt Leasing Ltd, becoming general manager of each business in turn.

From 2011 to 2015, Quinn was Regional Head of Commercial Banking for Asia-Pacific, based in Hong Kong. In December 2015, he became chief executive of Global Commercial Banking and was appointed a group managing director in September 2016.

He was appointed interim group chief executive in August 2019 and confirmed in the role in March 2020.

As chief executive he pursued a restructuring and capital redeployment that included a plan to reduce about 35,000 roles and to withdraw from mass‑market U.S. retail banking.

On 30 April 2024, Quinn announced his intention to retire.

HSBC announced in July 2024 that Georges Elhedery would succeed Quinn as group chief executive with effect from 2 September 2024; Quinn remained available to the Group during his notice period until 30 April 2025.

Quinn was appointed a Knight Bachelor in the 2025 New Year Honours.

Quinn was proposed as the new chair for Julius Baer Group in February 2025.

== Personal life ==
Quinn is married, with three adult children, and lives in Surrey.
