= Renaud de Planta =

Swiss banker

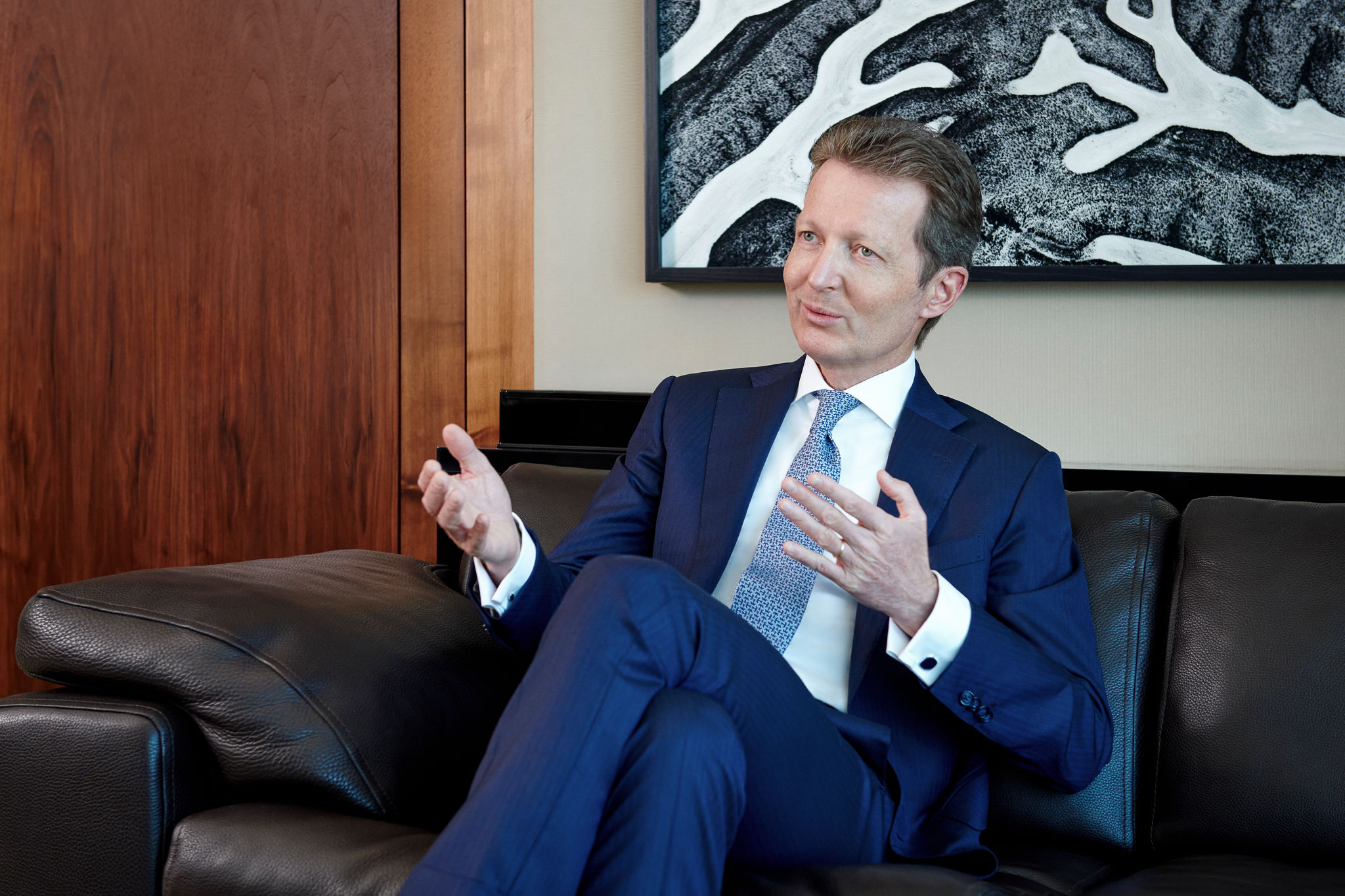
- de Planta in 2021
- Born: 15 November 1963 (age 62); Geneva, Switzerland
- Occupation: Swiss bank executive
- Years active: 1989–present

Renaud de Planta (born 15 November 1963) is a Swiss bank executive and former Senior Partner at the Pictet Group.

== Life ==
Renaud Fernand de Planta was born on 15 November 1963 in Geneva. He is the son of André de Planta and Muriel de Planta-Dominicé. The von Planta or de Planta family is a well-known Swiss noble family originating from the Grisons. De Planta grew up in Turin and Geneva and attended Geneva's Collège Calvin secondary school, graduating in June 1982 with the Type A Matura. He went on to study economics at the University of St. Gallen, followed by studies in economics, majoring in finance, at the Graduate School of Business of the University of Chicago, from where he obtained a Master of Business Administration (M.B.A) in 1987. He continued his studies at the University of St. Gallen and earned a doctorate in Economics (Dr. oec.) in 1989.

== Career ==
De Planta's career began in February 1988, when he took up a position at UBS in Zürich as a Senior Economist in the Economic Research Department. He then moved to UBS's Capital Market Department as Head of Product Development and Risk Management, before taking over responsibility for bond derivatives and, ultimately, bond trading. After two years as Head of Equities and Bonds at UBS in Geneva, the bank sent him to Hong Kong in June 1995 as CEO for North Asia, where he was responsible for the China, Hong Kong, Philippines, South Korea and Taiwan markets. He then served as Global Head of Equity Derivatives at UBS Warburg in London. In June 1998, he moved to the Pictet Group, where he became a Managing Partner upon joining. At Pictet, he was initially responsible for the fund business and in 1999 assumed joint responsibility for the Group's entire asset management operation, which he headed until the end of 2017. During this period, Pictet's asset management business grew substantially from a 20 to 230 billion Swiss francs, the second-largest Swiss provider in terms of assets under management. This growth was due in part to the product approach of asset management with the launch of new types of investment products in the area of thematic funds, as well as emerging market and long-short offerings.

The Pictet Group is managed by a limited number of Managing Partners. Unlike managers of typical commercial banks, there are differences in liability and remuneration. As such, Pictet's Managing Partners do not receive an employee's salary. At the end of 2017, Renaud de Planta took over the role of Deputy Senior Partner. In doing so, he relinquished responsibility for asset management and took charge of other important business units in the company. As the longest-serving partner at the time, Renaud de Planta was appointed Senior Partner of the Pictet Group with effect from 1 September 2019. In this role he represented the Pictet Group internally and externally. In the event of decisions where consensus cannot be reached among the Managing Partners, the Senior Partner acts as Primus inter pares (first among equals) and mediator in the team of equal partners.

In the wake of the collapse of Credit Suisse in the Spring of 2023, Renaud de Planta was the only active financial services executive appointed by Swiss Federal Councillor and Finance Minister Karin Keller-Sutter to the Expert Group on Banking Stability tasked with making proposals to the Federal Council to further strengthen the Swiss financial system. In September 2023 and effective May 2024, he was nominated to the Bank Council of the Swiss National Bank by the Federal Council. At the end of June 2024, de Planta stepped down from his role as senior partner of the Pictet Group and took a seat on the Board of Directors of the Group.

== Honours and awards ==
- De Planta was named Switzerland's top banker in both 2019 and 2022 by Swiss business magazine Bilanz.

== Other activities ==
- Member of the advisory board of the Booth School of Business at the University of Chicago, USA.
- Vice-president of the board of trustees of the International Center for Monetary and Banking Studies, Geneva.
- Board of Trustees of the International Museum of the Reformation Foundation, Geneva.
- Board of Trustees of the Foundation Fund of the von Planta Family, Zuoz.
- Member of the board of the Pictet Group Foundation.
- Member of the board of the Fondation pour l'attractivité du canton de Genève.
