= Alex Widmer =

Swiss banker (1956–2008)

Alex W. Widmer
- Born: 1 May 1956
- Died: 3 December 2008 (aged 52)
- Occupation: Former CEO of Julius Baer Group

Alex W. Widmer (1 May 1956 – 3 December 2008) was a Swiss banker who had been the chief executive officer of the Julius Baer Group, one of the world's largest providers of private banking services.

== Biography ==
Born in Zurzach, Widmer was an economist by education, who earned a Ph.D. from the University of St. Gallen, a research university in St. Gallen.

Widmer was hired by Julius Baer in 2005 from his previous position as head of private banking at Credit Suisse, succeeding Walter Knabenhans. He had been the head of the bank's private banking business prior to assuming responsibility for the entire bank, including asset management and investment products. Widmer had been appointed as chief executive of Julius Baer in November 2007, where he expanded the bank's offices into such places as Jakarta and Moscow, places where new wealth could be found.

He was found dead on 4 December 2008, with reports from sources cited in The New York Times claiming that the death was from suicide. Reports of the cause of death were contradictory and vague. Furthermore, the autopsy report was never released. Widmer was succeeded by Hans de Gier, Julius Baer's previous chief executive, who had been appointed as chairman of the bank's GAM business unit earlier in 2008.
