= Eric Louis Boetzel =

American lawyer

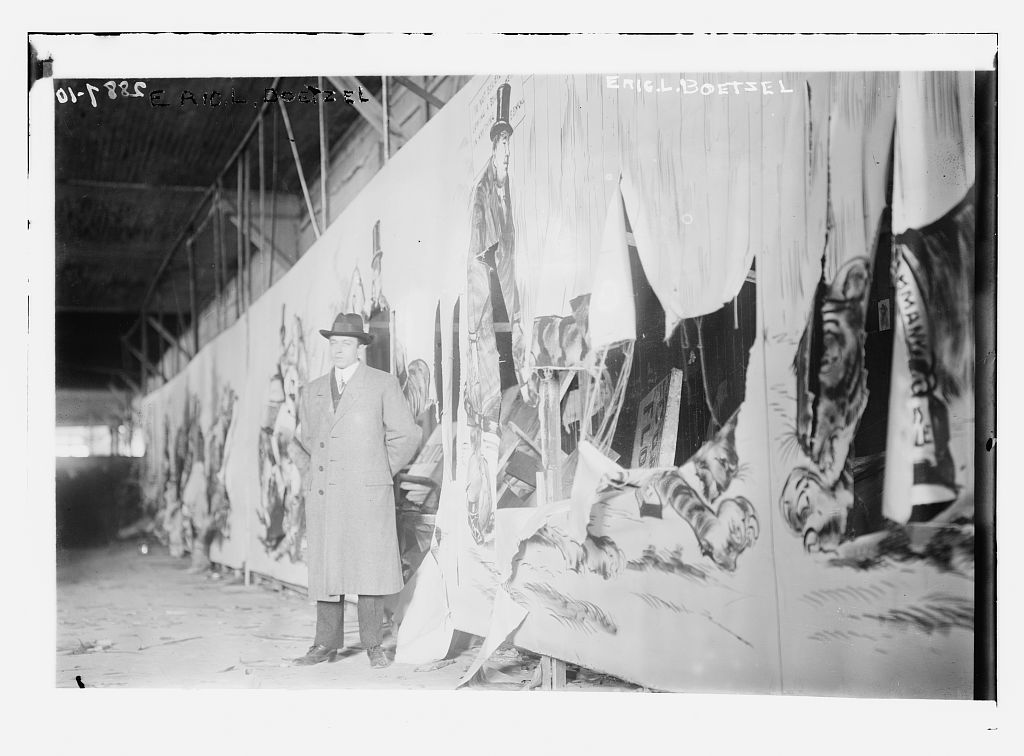
Eric Louis Boetsel

Eric Louis Boetzel (May 18, 1884 – January 1958) was the deputy Attorney General of New York State, and a former Manhattan Assistant District Attorney.

== Biography ==
He was born in Germany on May 18, 1884, to Augusta and Theodore Boetzel. They arrived in the United States in November 1889 and on June 2, 1905, he was made a US citizen. In 1907 he graduated from New York University with a law degree. In 1913 he resigned as Assistant District Attorney to become the assistant manager of the 1913 New York City mayoralty campaign of John Purroy Mitchel, the fusion candidate, who won the mayoralty.

In 1919 Boetzel was convicted for mail fraud. In 1920 he was disbarred.

By 1941 he was living in Ridgewood, New Jersey and working for the Metropolitan Life Insurance Company. He died in January 1958 in Florida.
