= Julius Baer Group =

Swiss private banking group

Julius Baer Group Ltd.
- Type: Public
- Traded as: SIX: BAER
- Industry: Financial services
- Founded: 1890; 136 years ago
- Founder: Julius Bär
- Headquarters: Zürich, Switzerland
- Key people: Noel Quinn (chairman); Stefan Bollinger (CEO); Jean Nabaa(COO); Peter Burrill (CFO); Victoria McLean (CCO); Ivan Ivanic (CRO)
- Products: Private banking, wealth management, Investment management, Sales and trading, Real estate financing
- Revenue: ▲CHF 3,861 million (2024)
- Operating income: ▲CHF 1,078 million (2024)
- Net income: ▲CHF 1,022 million (2024)
- AUM: ▲CHF 497.4 billion (2024)
- Total assets: ▲CHF 105,072 million (2024)
- Total equity: ▲CHF 6,829 million (2024)
- Number of employees: ▲7,595 (2024)
- Website: juliusbaer.com

Julius Baer Group Ltd. (German: Julius Bär Gruppe AG) is a Swiss multinational private banking and financial services firm headquartered in Zurich, Switzerland. Specializing in wealth management, investment advisory services, real estate financing, and selective trading services, it is one of the world’s largest dedicated private banks, with CHF 497.4 billion in managed assets as of 2024. It is listed on the SIX Swiss Exchange (ticker: BAER) and is a constituent of the Swiss Market Index Mid (SMI MID).

Founded in 1890, the bank originated as a family-run exchange office and later evolved into a public company. It operates in 28 countries and employs more than 7,500 staff globally. Julius Baer is noted for its traditional Swiss banking values, including a strong emphasis on client confidentiality.

== History ==
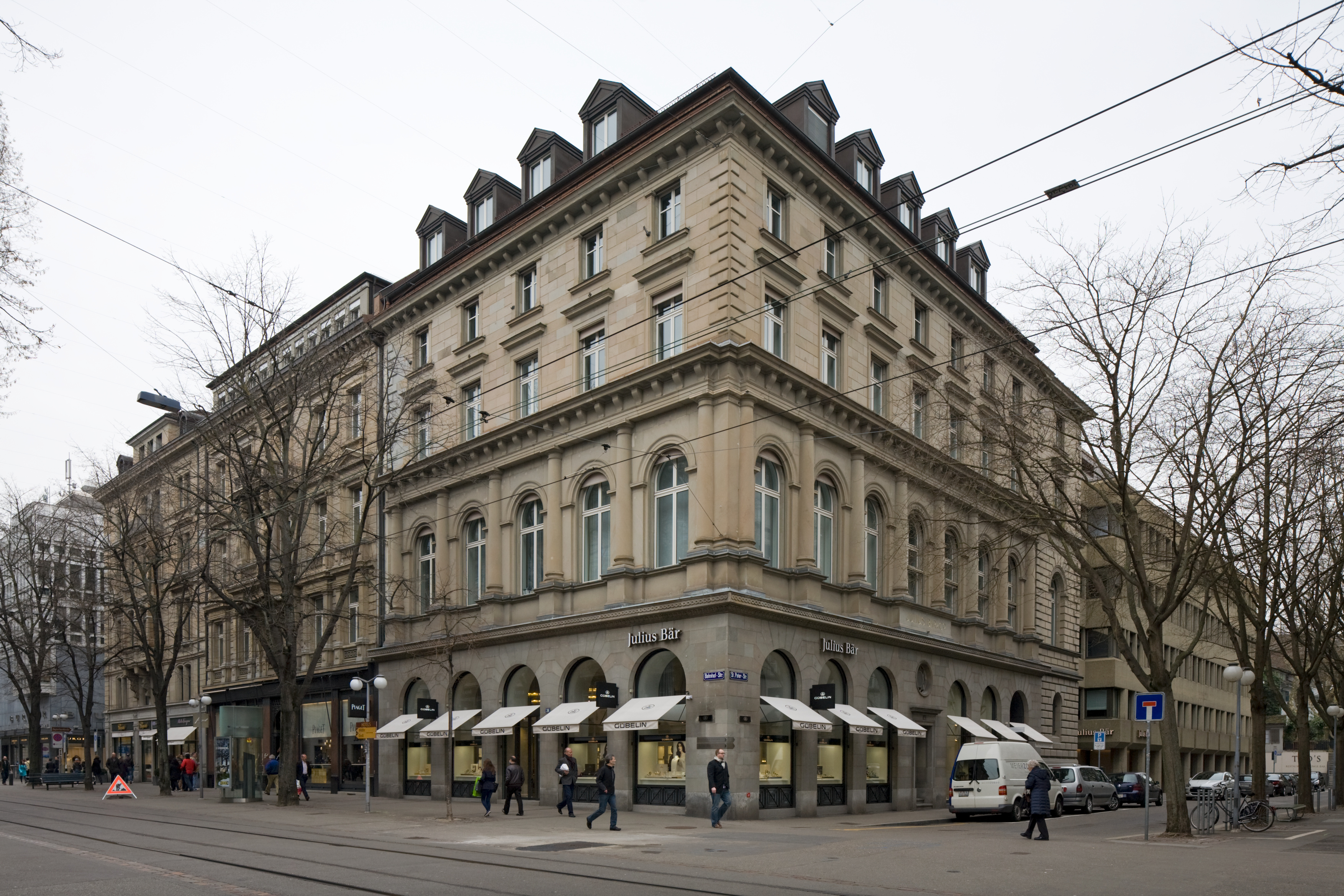
Julius Baer is headquartered at Bahnhofstrasse 36 in Zurich since 1924.

Julius Bär Group Ltd. is a Swiss private banking group which is the parent company of Bank Julius Baer, a traditional private bank based in Zürich, Switzerland. The firm dates itself back to 1890 when an exchange office was founded by Ludwig Hirschhorn and Theodor Grob. Grob left the firm in 1896 when Joseph Michael Uhl and Julius Bär joined. In 1901, Julius Bär acquired the bank and remained as partner until 1922. Hans E. Mayenfisch joined the bank on 1 July 1913 as partner and was active until 1947. The sons of Julius Bär became partners as follows: Walter Bär on 1 October 1913 until 1947, Werner Bär in 1921 until his death on 2 February 1960 and Richard Bär, who was a physicist became a silent partner in 1922. After his death in 1940 he was succeeded by his widow Ellen Bär.

The members of the 3rd generation became active in the bank with Hans Bär on 21 August 1947 until 1996, last as chairman of the board of Julius Baer Holding Ltd, Nicolas Bär on 22 September 1951 until March 1993, last as Chairman of Bank Julius Baer & Co.Ltd, Peter Bär on 1 November 1955 until his death on 11 November 1998 last as member of the board of Julius Baer Holding Ltd., and Rudolf Bär 1969 until 2005, last as member of the board of Julius Baer Holding Ltd. Hans Bär was succeeded as chairman by Thomas Bär 1996 until 2003. On 4 July 1970 Dr. Ernst Bieri, former head of the finance department of the City of Zürich joined as outside partner until 1990 as member of the board of Julius Baer Holding Ltd.

Since 1980, the Bank began accepting non-family investors until it became a listed public company in 2005. In September 2005, the bank acquired the formerly independent private bankers Ferrier, Lullin & Cie SA, Ehinger & Armand von Ernst AG, Banco di Lugano and the asset management house GAM (Global Asset Management) from UBS, making it one of the largest independent asset managers in Switzerland. In 2012, the bank acquired Merrill Lynch's wealth management business outside the US from Bank of America. The 4th generation was involved with the leadership of the bank with Raymond Bär from 1988 until 2012, last as chairman of the board of Julius Baer Holding Ltd. Michael Bär joined the bank in 1992 and was active in various senior operating functions, last as a member of the group executive committee until 2005. As representatives of the family shareholders Mark Bär (1999–2005), Andreas Bär (2003–2005) and Beatrice Speiser-Bär (2003–2009) were members of the board of Julius Baer Holding Ltd. Since its inception in 2014, the bank has been title sponsor of the Fédération Internationale de l'Automobile (FIA) Formula E Championship. The number of personnel by full-time equivalent grew from around 400 in 1980 to more than 2'000 in the year 2000 and further to more than 6'000 in 2020 when nearly half of them were employed in Julius Baer offices abroad.

In September 2022, Julius Baer announced a strategic investment and business partnership with GROW Investment Group (GROW) to gain access to chinese markets.

In July 2023, Julius Baer decided to refuse to work with clients domiciled in Russia. The bank began sending out letters to customers informing them that their accounts will be closed on December 31, cards and contracts will be cancelled. The letter states that "due to the current circumstances" the bank will no longer be able to offer services "that meet our standards".

On April 10, 2025, Julius Baer appointed former HSBC CEO Noel Quinn as Chairman, effective May 1, to help lead its recovery after losses linked to the Signa collapse.

== Capital and scale ==
Julius Baer originally operated as a partnership and was incorporated on 27 November 1974 with a share capital of CHF 14.040 million, divided into 56,400 registered shares of CHF 100 each and 16,800 bearer shares of CHF 500 each. The company went public in 1980. The Baer Families relinquished control in 2005 converting the share capital into a single class of registered shares all quoted at the SIX Swiss Exchange. Today, MFS Investment Management is the single biggest shareholder with nearly 10% of voting rights.

In 2020, Julius Baer announced it plans to slash 300 jobs, a decision which is a part of the company's CEO's three-year plan to improve the bank's profit margins.

In 2025, Julius Baer has announced plans to cut over 400 jobs, mostly in Switzerland, and reduce the size of the Executive Board's size from 15 to 5. This is a part of current CEO Stefan Bollinger's plan to cut costs amidst disappointing financial results

== Acquisitions ==
In September 2005, Julius Bär acquired the independent private banks Ferrier Lullin, (Note: In 2006, Jean Goutchkov, also spelled Ivan Guchkov (Russian: Иван Гучков; born 1954 Paris, France), was managing director at Ferrier Lullin.) Ehinger & Armand von Ernst, Banco di Lugano, and the asset management house Global Asset Management (GAM) from the Swiss banking giant UBS AG, to become one of the largest independent wealth management firms in Switzerland. UBS acquired almost 21% of Baer's shares as part of the deal, but sold off its stake in May 2007 to fund a share buyback. GAM was demerged as a separate company in October 2009. The companies of the group are consolidated within Julius Bär Gruppe AG, whose shares are listed on the SIX Swiss Exchange.

In November 2012, Julius Baer and Milan-based Kairos Investment Management SpA (‘Kairos’) announced that they had reached an agreement for a cooperation to jointly create a leading onshore wealth management player in Italy. Julius Baer’s Italian SIM was integrated into Kairos and, simultaneously, Julius Baer acquired 19.9% of Kairos. All Italian wealth management activities of the two groups run under the name Kairos Julius Baer.

Julius Baer acquired Merrill Lynch’s International Wealth Management business (IWM), based outside the US, in August 2012, for 860 million Swiss francs ($884.8 million). The deal grew Julius Baer's assets under management by 40%, raising the AuM to 251 billion francs ($258.2 billion).

In July 2014, Julius Baer announced that it had purchased the private banking assets of Israeli Bank Leumi.

== Controversies and lawsuits ==
=== WikiLeaks ===
In February 2008, Julius Baer Group sent cease and desist letters to Wikileaks and its domain registrar, Dynadot, resulting in subsequent legal action. This legal action was initiated after Wikileaks published documents related to about 1,600 clients with accounts in a Baer subsidiary in the Cayman Islands. These documents purportedly exposed alleged tax evasion and money laundering schemes.

The case garnered significant attention due to its implications for free speech and the right to information. It became a critical point of discussion among various organizations and media entities concerning the ethics and legality of whistleblowing and the publication of sensitive financial information. Initially, Julius Baer obtained a permanent injunction against Dynadot, resulting in the shutdown of the Wikileaks.org domain name. This move was widely criticized as an overreach and a potential violation of First Amendment rights in the United States. In response to this injunction, a coalition of organizations including the Electronic Frontier Foundation (EFF), American Civil Liberties Union (ACLU), and others intervened in the case, arguing against the injunction on the grounds of free speech and the public's right to know. Following the legal arguments and public backlash, the court, presided over by Judge White, dissolved the injunction on February 29, 2008. This decision allowed Wikileaks to restore its domain name and continue its operations. The court's decision was influenced by First Amendment concerns and the arguments raised by the intervenors and amici curiae. Subsequently, Julius Baer moved to dismiss the case on 5 March 2008, effectively ending the lawsuit. This outcome was seen as a significant victory for free speech advocates and set a precedent for how similar cases might be handled in the future, particularly those involving the publication of leaked documents on digital platforms.

==== Reaction ====
Julius Baer's attempt to silence WikiLeaks backfired spectacularly thanks to the Streisand effect. Initially, the bank obtained an injunction prohibiting WikiLeaks from publishing specific documents, but this garnered little media attention. However, their overzealous second injunction seeking to shut down the entire WikiLeaks website triggered a global outcry. This excessive measure only served to draw more attention to the very information they wanted to suppress, as only a small portion of the documents concerned Julius Baer directly.

WikiLeaks cleverly circumvented the website shutdown by utilizing alternate domains and an accessible IP address. Pursuing further legal action to block these alternatives would have been a complex and geographically scattered endeavor, proving challenging for Julius Baer.

Adding to the drama, a fabricated claim of misidentification was exposed. When an individual disputed their inclusion in the leaked documents, WikiLeaks appended a caveat attributing the information to "three independent sources." This, however, turned out to be a fabrication, further highlighting the complexity and potential inaccuracies within the leaked data.

On 17 January 2011, Rudolf Elmer provided Wikileaks with the alleged bank account details of 2,000 individuals and corporations from three financial institutions, including Julius Baer. Elmer, a previous employee of Julius Baer, worked for the bank from the early 1980s until 2002 when he was dismissed for data theft. In 2008, Elmer had previously leaked bank information to Wikileaks, according to the German magazine Der Spiegel, which had referred to his documents as ‘partly authentic and partly fake'. It was subsequently reported that the discs had been empty, and the event a ploy to draw attention to Elmer’s court proceedings in Switzerland.

=== Sudden passing of CEO Alex Widmer ===
Alex Widmer, then chief executive officer of Bank Julius Baer, died unexpectedly on 4 December 2008 at the age of 52. Widmer joined Julius Baer in 2005 and was appointed CEO of the bank in November 2007. Unidentified sources, cited in The New York Times , claimed the cause of death being suicide. Widmer was succeeded by Hans de Gier, former CEO of Julius Baer Group, who assumed responsibilities on an interim basis.

In May 2009, Boris Collardi assumed the role as CEO for the Julius Baer Group Ltd. and Bank Julius Baer & Co. Ltd.

=== U.S. Federal Investigation ===
In 2011, Julius Baer became one of a dozen Swiss banks to come under U.S. federal investigation for allegedly aiding US citizens in committing tax evasion. The bank subsequently chose to engage with federal investigators, cooperating with the US Department of Justice investigation and accepting responsibility for its conduct. On 4 February 2016, the bank signed a deferred prosecution agreement with the DOJ and agreed to pay a fine of $547 million. Acting Chief Executive Bernhard Hodler reacted to the agreement in a statement saying that "This important step confirms Julius Baer's approach to cooperating constructively with competent authorities and our commitment to fulfill our regulatory obligations and responsibilities."

=== Money Laundering ===
On 20 February 2020 the Swiss Financial Market Supervisory Authority (FINMA) censured Julius Baer for falling "significantly short" in combating money laundering between 2009 and 2018 with regards to corruption allegations involving FIFA and PDVSA, Venezuela's state-owned oil and gas company. FINMA ordered Julius Baer to change its remuneration and recruitment policies, and appointed an auditor to oversee the bank to ensure its compliance with anti-money laundering standards. In March 2021, FINMA lifted the ban on large acquisitions for Julius Baer. The move was driven by a report by an independent auditor that supervised the implementation of the measures that FINMA ordered. Julius Baer said it welcomed the move and noted the "significant progress the bank has made in strengthening its company-wide risk management."

Julius Baer, a Swiss bank, faced significant controversy stemming from its involvement in a money laundering scheme associated with corrupt Venezuelan officials. The scandal came to light in 2018 when Matthias Krull, a former banker at Julius Baer, was arrested on money laundering charges in Miami while vacationing with his family. Krull's cooperation with U.S. authorities led to a reduction in his 10-year prison sentence by 65% in September 2023. Swiss regulators also found systemic failures in Julius Baer's compliance practices in 2022, which included deficiencies in identifying its Latin American clients and incentivizing behaviors that raised money laundering concerns.

In 2015, Julius Baer began cooperating with the US Department of Justice concerning its investigation of alleged money laundering and corruption involving officials and affiliates of the world soccer federation, FIFA. Julius Baer subsequently entered into a three-year deferred prosecution agreement with the DOJ & agreed to pay fines totaling over $79 million. On May 27, 2021, Julius Baer finalized the agreement with the DOJ, resolving the investigation of the Bank’s role.

=== Financial Times Investigation into Fraud at Julius Baer ===
In October 2023, the Financial Times published an investigation into alleged Julius Baer fraud. The article tells about the couple Gregory and Vera Mirlas who entrusted their wealth to the Swiss private bank Julius Baer through an independent wealth management advisor. Subsequently, they discovered a significant misappropriation of their assets starting in 2009. This alleged fraud came to light in October 2019, when the couple met with their Goldman Sachs banker at Julius Baer's headquarters and discovered significant discrepancies in their account balances. Their former advisor, Benjamin G. of Julius Baer, was later charged with embezzlement and sentenced to three years in prison in October 2023. The couple also filed civil lawsuits against Benjamin G. and Julius Baer, as well as a complaint with FINMA, the Swiss financial regulator, to investigate potential compliance violations and facilitation of money laundering by the bank.

== Corporate social responsibility ==
=== Julius Baer Foundation ===
The main focus of the Julius Baer Foundation is youth, vocational training, recycling and wealth inequality. Projects that directly benefit the younger generation are sponsored in various ways. Set up in 1965 by Walter J. Baer initially for charitable causes in Switzerland, the scope has grown together with the expansion of the business to a global scale. Julius Baer Foundation works together with and supports among others Sistema B (Chile), Solafrica (Ethiopia), Swisscontact (Switzerland) and Plastic Free Planet (UK). It continues its traditional support of the Julius Baer employee-based JB Cares organisation and selected art museums in Switzerland.

In 2020, JB Cares and the JB Foundation supported aid programmes in Lebanon following the accident in the port of Beirut on 4 August 2020.

Since 2019, Romeo Lacher has been the president and chairman of the Julius Baer Foundation. Andreas Weinberg serves as vice president.

== See also ==
- Julius Baer Group controversies
- Banking in Switzerland
- List of banks in Switzerland
