= UBS tax evasion controversies =

Tax evasion by Swiss bank UBS

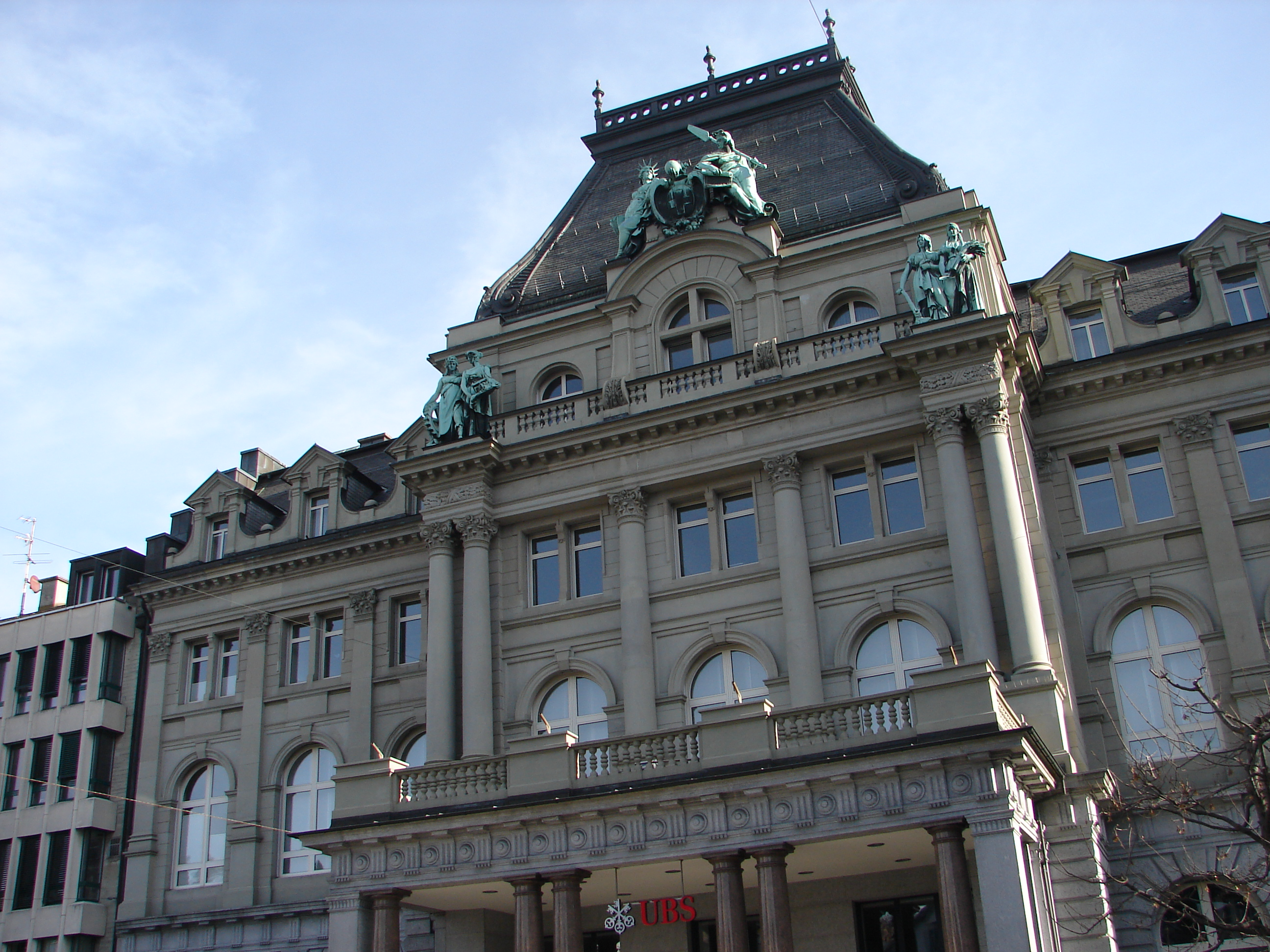
UBS Group AG building in St. Gallen. UBS maintains strict banking secrecy practices which have been used to facilitate tax evasion

The Swiss investment bank and financial services company, UBS Group AG, has been at the center of numerous tax evasion and avoidance investigations undertaken by U.S., French, German, Israeli, and Belgian tax authorities as a consequence of their strict banking secrecy practices.

The first major tax evasion controversy the bank was involved in occurred in 2007. Bradley Birkenfeld, an American banker stationed at UBS Switzerland AG, broke Swiss banking secrecy laws to disclose client information to the U.S. Department of Justice (DOJ) alleging suspected tax evasion. After the DOJ opened an investigation, UBS was fined US$780 million and reached a limited deferred prosecution agreement that was seen as a historically significant event in the banking industry of Switzerland. Despite the brief lapse in banking secrecy, the country has strengthened its banking secrecy laws and UBS adopted an international "Client Privacy Code" to protect client information from disclosure.

Since the initial "Birkenfeld Disclosure", UBS has been at the center of various other tax evasion investigations undertaken by multiple international governments and tax authorities. It has been investigated by U.S. authorities since 2015, Belgian authorities since 2014, French authorities since 2013, German authorities since 2012 and Israeli authorities since 2011.

== Birkenfeld disclosure, 2007 ==
In 2005, UBS private banker Bradley Birkenfeld claimed that he learned that UBS's dealings with American clients violated an agreement between the bank and the U.S. Internal Revenue Service. He resigned from UBS on 5 October 2005 after reading an internal document prepared by UBS's legal department that delineated prohibited cross-border banking activities in the United States. The prohibitions were antithetical to the job description of wealth managers servicing American clients in the United States. Birkenfeld believes that the memorandum was prepared to give UBS legal cover should bank-sanctioned illegal activities be uncovered. The bank could then shift the blame to its employees. He subsequently complained to UBS compliance about the bank's "unfair and deceptive business practices". According to Birkenfeld, when he received no response, three months later he wrote to Peter Kurer, then General Counsel for UBS, about the illegal practices. He became a partner at Union Charter Ltd., where he specialized in wealth management, resigning from the position on 3 June 2008.

=== DOJ informant ===
In 2007, Bradley Birkenfeld decided to tell the DOJ what he knew about UBS's practices. At the same time, he wanted to take advantage of a new federal whistleblower law, the Tax Relief and Health Care Act of 2006, that could pay him up to 30% of any tax revenue recouped by the IRS as a result of Birkenfeld's information. Birkenfeld also wanted immunity from prosecution for his part in UBS's transactions. In April 2007, Birkenfeld's counsel sent the DOJ a summary of Birkenfeld's information. The DOJ responded that it was not part of the IRS's whistleblower program and that it would not grant Birkenfeld immunity. Nonetheless, Birkenfeld met with the DOJ. When communications between Birkenfeld and the DOJ stalled, Birkenfeld contacted the Securities and Exchange Commission, the IRS, and the U.S. Senate.

In June 2008, the U.S. Federal Bureau of Investigation made a formal request to travel to Switzerland to probe a multi-million-dollar tax evasion case involving UBS. That same month, a United States Senate panel accused Swiss banks, including UBS and LGT Group, of helping wealthy Americans evade taxes through offshore accounts, and calculated the total cost of this practice as being in excess of US$100 billion annually. The report specifically accused UBS AG and Liechtenstein's LGT Group of allegedly marketing tax-evasion strategies to wealthy Americans. U.S. clients held about 19,000 accounts at UBS, with an estimated US$18 billion to US$20 billion in assets, in Switzerland, according to the findings.

=== Arrest and award ===
Ironically, the DOJ decided to charge Birkenfeld with a felony count of conspiring to abet tax evasion by one of his clients, Igor Olenicoff. In 2008, Birkenfeld pleaded guilty and, in 2009, was sentenced to 40 months in prison. Many advocacy groups from around the world criticized Birkenfeld's prosecution and sentence on the grounds that it would discourage financial industry whistleblowers. Birkenfeld was released from prison on 1 August 2012. On 11 September 2012, the IRS Whistleblower Office paid Birkenfeld a $104 million award for acting as a corporate whistleblower. The Swiss media credit Birkenfeld's act with affecting a sea change in Swiss banking.

After Birkenfeld's award, the Swiss newspaper Blick claimed, "Birkenfeld was a blessing for the Swiss financial industry", in that his revelations helped accelerate the industry's transition away from its reliance on "dirty" money by dooming the bank secrecy laws that enabled tax evasion.

Birkenfeld has compared the Swiss banking industry with gangsters. "In essence, bank secrecy is analogous to criminal racketeering – and the Swiss government, along with every Swiss private banker, is a co-conspirator."

=== U.S. settlement ===
In response to the report and the FBI investigation, UBS announced that it would cease providing cross-border private banking services to US-domiciled clients through its non-US regulated units as of July 2008. In November 2008, a U.S. federal grand jury indicted Raoul Weil, chairman and CEO of UBS Global Wealth Management and Business Banking and member of UBS's Group Executive Board, in connection with the ongoing investigation of UBS's US cross-border business. UBS would eventually cut ties to Raoul Weil in May 2009 and he would face charges after UBS had settled its criminal case with the government. Raoul Weil would later be acquitted of all charges by a U.S. federal jury in November 2014.

UBS agreed on 18 February 2009 to pay a fine of US$780 million to the U.S. government and entered into a deferred prosecution agreement on charges of conspiring to defraud the United States by impeding the Internal Revenue Service. Of this fine, US$380 million represents disgorgement of profits from its cross-border business; the balance represents United States taxes that UBS failed to withhold on the accounts. The figures include interest, penalties and restitution for unpaid taxes. As part of the deal, UBS also settled Securities and Exchange Commission charges of having acted as an unregistered broker/dealer and investment adviser for Americans. Additionally, UBS paid US$200 million for settlement with the U.S. Securities Exchange Commission (SEC) to avoid a trial on UBS' alleged conduct that the company facilitated the ability of certain U.S. clients to maintain undisclosed accounts in Switzerland and other foreign countries, which enabled those clients to evade paying taxes related to the assets in those accounts.

=== Proposed bank secrecy rollback ===
The day after settling its criminal case on 19 February 2009, the U.S. government filed a civil suit against UBS to reveal the names of all 52,000 American customers, alleging that the bank and these customers conspired to defraud the IRS and federal government of legitimately owed tax revenue. Shortly thereafter, Hillary Clinton, having been sworn in as Secretary of State in January, traveled to Geneva on March 6, 2009, to meet with the Swiss Foreign Minister to announce a settlement of the IRS suit. Within a few months, the Internal Revenue Service and the Department of Justice had arranged a tentative settlement in which the Swiss Financial Market Supervisory Authority (FINMA) would reveal information on 4,450 of the 52,000 accounts sought by the IRS, preserving the anonymity of more than 90 percent of the United States customers of UBS's cross-border business.

On 12 August 2009, UBS announced a settlement deal that ended its litigation with the IRS. U.S. Senator Carl Levin (D-MI), who conducted Senate hearings into the UBS tax evasion scandal, described the settlement agreement (known as the "Annex") "disappointing".

[T]he tortured wording and the many limitations in this Annex shows the Swiss Government trying to preserve as much bank secrecy as it can for the future, while pushing to conceal the names of tens of thousands of suspected U.S. tax cheats. It is disappointing that the U.S. government went along.

However, this settlement set up a showdown between the U.S. and Swiss governments over the secrecy of Swiss bank accounts. It was not until June 2010 that Swiss lawmakers approved a deal to reveal client data and account details of U.S. clients who were suspected of tax evasion.

== Renzo Gadola case ==
Renzo Gadola, a Swiss banker and investment manager, was arrested for helping American citizens evade paying taxes via offshore financial vehicles. After working at UBS from 1995 to 2008, Gadola founded RG Investment Partners (Zurich). Fingered by UBS whistleblower Bradley Birkenfeld, federal authorities arrested Gadola in Florida in 2010. Federal prosecutors alleged that Gadola, while still employed by UBS, not only helped American taxpayers evade taxes, but actively discouraged them from joining the Internal Revenue Service (IRS) program established to provide amnesty for American tax evaders who voluntarily disclosed their accounts. The program was set up in the wake of the 2008-09 UBS tax evasion scandal. The federal government also charged 36 of his clients with tax evasion.

Gadola cooperated with the U.S. government and turned in his American clients and two other Swiss bankers involved in abetting tax evasion by Americans. His case for the first time revealed how the major international Swiss banks used smaller, regional Swiss banks to hide the undeclared assets held in offshore accounts by their American clientele. Renzo Gadola was arrested in Miami, Florida on 7 November 2010. Federal agents recorded him discussing methods of evading taxes with a client. Prosecutors said he immediately began to cooperate with the government, and was instrumental in abetting the government in pursuing cases against his clients and two other Swiss bankers involved in helping Americans hide their assets from IRS scrutiny.

Gadola wore a wire that enabled federal agents to tape his clients who continued to maintain secret Swiss bank accounts with intent to defraud the United States. Information provided by Gadola led to the arrest of Swiss bankers Christos Bagios, a Greek national resident in Switzerland who worked at both Credit Suisse Group AG and UBS, and Martin Lack, formerly of UBS. On 22 December 2010, Gadola pleaded guilty to conspiracy to defraud the United States by enabling American citizens to evade taxes. Federal prosecutors recommended leniency due to his cooperation with the Department of Justice (DOJ) and the IRS, recommending a sentence of five months imprisonment and five months home confinement. In November 2011, Gadola was sentenced to five years probation and fined $100.

== Christos Bagios ==
On 26 January 2011, Christos Bagios was arrested in New York. He had worked for UBS between 1992 and 2005 before going to work for Credit Suisse, which fired him after his arrest. The DOJ said his criminal activities occurred while he was in the employ of UBS. The DOJ charged Bagios with engaging in a conspiracy with Gadola, Martin Lack and Hansruedi Schumacher (arrested in 2009) of abetting tax evasion by American citizens. He was accused of helping 150 of his American customers conceal up to $500 million in assets from the IRS while a UBS employee. On 6 November 2012, Bagios pleaded guilty to one count of conspiracy involving defrauding the federal government in excess of $1.08 million while an employee at UBS from 1993 to 2009.

After UBS informed its American customers they had to terminate undeclared accounts in 2009, Bagios informed a client that he might be able to transfer undeclared assets to a smaller regional Swiss bank. As part of a plea bargain, the DOL recommended Bagios be sentenced to time served, which amounted to 37 days of imprisonment and approximately 19 months of house arrest. The DOJ wanted the sentence passed immediately to enable Bagios to be reunited with his family. The DOJ praised his cooperation and said his conduct was not as egregious as that practiced by others. U.S. District Judge Kenneth Marra approved the deal.

== Martin Lack ==
Martin Lack is a Swiss national who served as an executive director of UBS North America International through 2003, when he left to set up a Zurich-based asset management company, Lack & Partner Asset Management AG. He was indicted on 2 August 2011. Lack was charged with conspiracy to abet tax evasion by Americans by enabling them to shelter their assets in a small regional bank in Switzerland. He was charged with opening and maintaining secret bank accounts at a Swiss regional bank to enable American citizens to avoid the scrutiny of the IRS and keep their assets at an arm's length from UBS. The United States had struck an agreement with UBS that it would not abet American tax evasion.

After leaving UBS, Lack served as a business partner of Renzo, who directed clients to him. Like Renzo, Lack advised his American clients not to cooperate with U.S. authorities or partake in the IRS's voluntary disclosure program created in the wake of the UBS tax evasion scandal. He provided a prepaid cell phone to some clients, to be used to contact him to thwart surveillance by law enforcement agencies. In November 2011, the federal government taped Gadola advising one of his clients on the advantages of using Lack. Since the client's assets would be in cash and kept in a safe in Lack's office, there would be no paper trail. Gadola told his client, "You have no link to UBS whatsoever, so 99.9 percent you have nothing to worry about."

While at UBS, Renzo advised his American client Amir Zavieh of San Francisco, who held a numbered bank account at UBS, to utilize Lack's services to hide his Swiss franc assets to evade detection by the IRS. When Lack demanded a Form W-9 from Zavieh that would identify him as the owner of the account and expose the assets to the IRS, Zavieh moved his assets to another investment manager. Lack surrendered himself to U.S. authorities on 13 October 2013 and pleaded guilty on 26 February 2014. Lack was sentenced to five years of probation and fined $7,500 in federal court in Fort Lauderdale, Florida, where he was indicted in 2011. "I apologize for my conduct," Lack told U.S. District Judge William Dimitrouleas. "I was given an opportunity to make amends for what I've done, which I did to the best of my ability."

== Raoul Weil Disclosure: 2014 ==
After Raoul Weil was indicted and failed to show up for arraignment, the U.S. government issued an international arrest warrant for Weil. While on vacation in Italy in November 2013, Weil was arrested by Italian authorities on the basis of the American warrant. Weil soon waived his rights and was extradited to the United States. In January 2014, Weil pleaded not-guilty in federal court to helping U.S. taxpayers evade taxes on $20 billion in offshore assets.

The trial began in Ft. Lauderdale on 14 October 2014 and the jury found him not guilty on 3 November 2014. Jurors deliberated just over an hour before returning a not guilty verdict.

== Israeli tax investigation: 2011–present ==
In 2011, US authorities began investigating three of Israel's largest banks, Bank Leumi, Bank Hapoalim and Mizrahi-Tefahot, suspected of helping their American clients evade taxes. In 2014, Israel arrested 28 people after the investigation revealed thousands of Swiss bank accounts held by Israelis. The Israeli Tax Authority said they "suspected that the vast majority of money held in the accounts is not reported to the tax authority". In March 2018, the Israel State Attorney's Office filed multiple indictments against 11 Israelis for fraud, deceit, omitting income from a tax return and filing a false return.

== German tax investigation: 2012–present ==
UBS Deutschland AG came under investigation by prosecutors in Mannheim in the land of Baden Wuerttemberg after a tax probe revealed suspicious funds transfers from Germany to Switzerland allegedly facilitated by UBS Deutschland's Frankfurt office. Prosecutors are investigating UBS's abetting of tax evasion by German taxpayers from 2004 to 2012. The investigation is expected to lessen the chances that a German-Swiss tax treaty already approved by the Bundestag, the lower house of the German parliament, will be rejected by the Bundesrat, the German Senate, which is in control of the Social Democrats.

UBS Deutschland's Frankfurt office was raided by tax investigators in May, and over 100,000 computer files and records were seized. The evidence is being assessing this evaluated for evidence that UBS employees enabled tax evasion. The bank, which claims it is cooperating with the investigators, says that "an internal investigation into the specific allegations has not identified any evidence of misbehavior by UBS Deutschland AG."

A similar probe of Credit Suisse Group AG's resulted in a €150 million settlement with the bank.

== French tax investigation: 2013–present ==
In 2013, a case analogous to the U.S. investigation of UBS, France launched an investigation into UBS France's alleged abetting of tax evasion by French tax payers. The investigation was spurred by the March 2012 publication of a muckraking book about UBS, Ces 600 milliards qui manquent à la France – Enquête au cœur de l'évasion fiscale ("Those 600 billion which France is missing – Inquiry into the heart of tax evasion"), estimated the amount of tax income lost to UBS-controlled offshore accounts at €600 billion.

The crackdown in France began in earnest after the revelation that Jerome Cahuzac, who served as budget director in the government of President Francois Hollande, had a secret Swiss bank account. An investigation was launched to determine whether UBS illegally solicited clients in France. In June 2013, French banking regulators fined UBS France 10 million euros for failures that could have allowed UBS clients to commit tax evasion. A month later, am investigation into allegations that UBS engaged in money laundering of assets generated by tax fraud was launched.

UBS France executive Patrick de Fayet was among three local branch executives are being investigated. UBS wealth management bankers allegedly broke the law by enabling French taxpayers in hiding their assets in UBS-controlled offshore assets to evade taxes. The bankers had the intention of directing their French clients assets to UBS's Switzerland operation, rather than keeping the money in France. Arrest warrants were issued for three former UBS France employees in January 2015 after they failed to appear before French magistrates leading the investigation. UBS faces fines of up to five billion euros for its alleged role in tax fraud, according to the French newspaper Le Temps. In July 2014, the bank was required to post a bond of 1.1 billion euros, which UBS complied with while making multiple appeals in the French court system, finally losing its appeal at the Cour de Cassation, France's highest court. UBS may appeal that ruling to the European Court of Human Rights.

In February 2015, Bradley Birkenfeld, the key figure in the UBS tax evasion scandal in the U.S., was subpoenaed by French magistrate investigating the case. The U.S. Justice Department approved allowing Birkenfeld, who is still on parole, to visit France to testify against UBS. Federal Judge William Zloch gave Birkenfeld permission to travel to France from 27 February to 1 March 2015 to appear before the French court. In 2014, UBS accused the French government of engaging in a "highly politicized process" in its investigation of the bank and its French subsidiary.

In January 2016, the French Tax authorities announced that based on the records seized by the German tax authorities that 38,000 undeclared accounts were held by French nationals with total assets amounting to over €12 Billion.

In February 2019, a French court fined UBS $4.9 Billion for helping clients evade taxes.

== Belgian tax investigation: 2014–present ==
In June 2014, the chief executive of UBS Belgium, Marcel Brühwiler, was arrested on suspicion of fraud, while UBS' offices and Brühwiler's residence were searched by police. It is alleged that UBS Belgium actively recruited rich Belgians, proposing to funnel funds to secret Swiss accounts, enabling tax avoidance.

== U.S. tax investigation: 2015–present ==
In February 2015, UBS announced that it was being investigated by the Office of the U.S. Attorney for the Eastern District of New York and the Securities Exchange Commission over new allegations that UBS facilitated tax evasion by its U.S. clientele. The focus of the investigation is the possible sale of bearer bonds. Bearer bonds are a type of unregistered security that provide a degree of anonymity to the owner as they can be transferred anonymously when held in paper form, thus enabling tax evasion as such transfers would allow the owner to conceal their financial assets. Although the bearer security can be traded electronically (which would create an electronic record), when the security exited the system via a clearing house, the transaction would still essentially be anonymous unless a party actually sought the information. UBS announced it was cooperating with the investigation.

The U.S. Attorney's Office was acting on information gathered by the FBI, which interviewed UBS employees. According to The Wall Street Journal, bearer bonds went out of favor in the U.S. in 1982 when their treatment under U.S. law was changed to discourage their use, as they had been an ideal vehicle for tax evasion. The unfavorable tax treatment and penalties enacted in 1982 discouraged the use of bearer bonds, which made the possible use of such securities by UBS clients suspect. UBS employees allegedly discussed the legal ramifications of the use of bearer bonds with their clients. The purpose of the investigation was U.S. investigators trying to determine the exact nature of those alleged discussions and whether they amounted to a criminal effort to conceal what had allegedly already been done.

The investigation was spurred by revelations of a whistleblower. Launched in January 2015, the investigation also has the aim of determining whether bearer bonds were provided as investment vehicles to UBS clientele, either directly or via UBS buying and holding the bonds in the client's name, before the expiration of its 2009 deferred prosecution agreement with the U.S. Department of Justice. The agreement lapsed in October 2010. If it is determined that UBS violated the agreement, the federal government can indict UBS on new charges stemming from the violation. In such a case, prosecutors would likely ask for significant fines and for UBS to be put under regulatory oversight.
