= Raoul Weil =

Swiss banker (born 1959)

Raoul Weil (born 13 November 1959) is a Swiss banker. Weil is best known as being the former chairman and chief executive officer of Global Wealth Management & Business Banking at UBS AG. Weil eventually became a member of UBS's group executive board.

During Weil's tenure at UBS, the bank became embroiled in the 2008-09 U.S. tax evasion controversy, which led to Weil's voluntary departure from the bank after he was indicted by the U.S. Justice Department for allegedly offering help to thousands of UBS's U.S. clients who failed to pay their federal income taxes. Arrested in October 2013 during a trip to Italy, Weil has been extradited to the United States. On December 16, 2013, Weil was released on $10.5 million bail by the federal district court in Fort Lauderdale, Florida. The trial began in Ft. Lauderdale on October 14, 2014, and the jury found him not guilty on November 3, 2014.

== Early life ==
Weil was born in Switzerland. Weil graduated from the University of Basel with a degree in economics. He also earned a master's degree in economics with a specialization in national economics and business administration.

== Charitable Activities ==
Raoul Weil is a member of the Optimus Foundation, a charitable foundation administered by UBS which helps with disease prevention and education across the world. In 2008, Weil was elected chairman of the Optimus Foundation's board, pledging the foundation to the goal of becoming the largest charitable organization in Switzerland in the next decade.

In September 2008, Weil led the Global UBS Philanthropy Forum, which brought together philanthropists, business leaders, social entrepreneurs, and representatives from civil society from around the world to consider the theme of “Building Change Communities.”

== Banking career ==
After he finished active duty in the Swiss military in 1984, Weil was hired by the Swiss Bank Corporation (SBC), and worked in SBC's private banking division in Basel, Zurich, Monaco, New York City, and Hong Kong from 1984 until 1998. When SBC and UBS merged in 1998, Weil joined UBS as part of its private banking division for Asia and Europe, becoming head of UBS's Wealth Management International unit in 2002. In July 2007, Weil became CEO of WM&BB.

On November 12, 2008, Weil voluntarily relinquished his duties with UBS to focus on his defense after being indicted in connection with the ongoing investigation of UBS's US cross-border business by the United States Department of Justice. The United States issued an international arrest warrant for Weil in 2008.

On May 23, 2008, the Swiss Federal Banking Commission (EBK, the predecessor to FINMA) opened an investigation into UBS's role in facilitating tax evasion by its US clients. The EBK concluded, among other things, that UBS's “top management” was not aware of the bank's US clients’ fraudulent conduct, and were not “accessories or accomplices” to UBS's violations. The EBK also found that the US cross-border business's managers at the time – Martin Liechti and Michel Guignard – were the principal architects of UBS's wrongdoing and had actively concealed their misconduct from Weil.

After leaving UBS, Weil was hired as a consultant in 2010 by Reuss Private Group (Pfäffikon, Schwyz, Switzerland), eventually becoming a managing partner. At the beginning of 2013, he succeeded Adriano B. Lucatelli as chief executive officer of Reuss Private Group. In February 2013, FINMA granted Reuss a license to deal in securities and certified that Reuss management, including Weil, was engaged in “proper business conduct” (Gewähr für eine einwandfreie Geschäftstätigkeit). As part of the application process, Weil confirmed in writing that he had not concealed anything with respect to the US-UBS tax dispute.

On December 2, 2013, Weil was replaced by Felix Brem as CEO of Reuss Private Group.

== US Tax Evasion Controversy ==
In 2008, the U.S. Federal Bureau of Investigation began probing a multimillion-dollar tax evasion case involving UBS due to disclosures made by Brad Birkenfeld, a former UBS banker in Switzerland, who was arrested entering the United States and cooperated with the US Department of Justice, the US Securities and Exchange Commission, and the US Internal Revenue Service. Concurrently, a United States Senate subcommittee accused Swiss banks, including UBS, of helping wealthy Americans evade taxes through offshore accounts, which it estimated cost of the U.S. excess of US$100 billion annually.

In response, UBS announced that it would cease providing cross-border private banking services to US-domiciled clients through its non-US regulated units as of July 2008.

As part of its investigation into the conduct of UBS's US cross-border business, DOJ demanded client banking records from UBS. Under Swiss bank secrecy laws, UBS was prohibited from turning over such documents. The Swiss government interceded and began negotiating with DOJ in an effort to persuade DOJ to stop trying to force UBS to violate Swiss law. On November 6, 2008, a U.S. federal grand jury indicted Raoul Weil in connection with the ongoing investigation of UBS, and DOJ obtained an order from the court there placing the indictment under seal. On November 10, 2008, Swiss Finance Minister Hans-Rudolf Merz and head of the Swiss Federal Department of Justice and Police Eveline Widmer-Schlumpf sent a letter to U.S. Attorney General Michael Mukasey and Treasury Secretary Henry Paulsen asking that DOJ go through the information-sharing provisions of the US-Switzerland Double Taxation Treaty if it wanted to obtain information regarding UBS's clients. Weil's indictment was unsealed two days later, on November 12, 2008. According to one high-level Swiss source, “[t]hat was a clear message . . . One can imagine that without the letter they would have at least delayed the indictment of Weil.”

Weil soon thereafter left the bank to focus on the criminal case. On February 18, 2009, UBS agreed to pay a fine of US$780 million to the U.S. government and entered into a deferred prosecution agreement on charges of conspiring to defraud the United States by impeding the Internal Revenue Service. Weil's charges were not dismissed as part of UBS's deal, and he continued to face charges even after UBS had settled its criminal case and a subsequent dispute with the US government and IRS in the Fall of 2009, which resulted in UBS's agreeing to turn over thousands of US customer files to the US.

On 6 January 2014, the National Whistleblowers Center claimed that Weil "will make a sweetheart deal with the DOJ" because he has "information that would be extremely embarrassing to wealthy and powerful people" in the United States and elsewhere." Notwithstanding this claim, no such deal has apparently been reached. Weil is preparing for trial.

== Legal Issues ==
Weil was declared a fugitive by Judge James Cohn on January 13, 2009. Weil has maintained his innocence of the charges against him. Weil, who remained in Switzerland, his home country and place of residence, after being indicted, maintains that he did not run from the United States.

=== Extradition to U.S. ===
On October 19, 2013, Weil was arrested in Bologna, Italy while on a trip from Switzerland. Weil's request for house arrest was turned down by Italian authorities, and Weil decided not to contest extradition to the United States. Weil's willingness to return to the U.S. raised the suspicion that he may have been offered a "sweetheart deal" by the U.S. Department of Justice, which treated another UBS conspirator, Martin Liechti, extremely leniently, according to Bradley Birkenfeld's lawyer, Stephen M. Kohn of the National Whistleblower Center.

Birkenfeld worked several levels below Weil at UBS, and apparently did not know him. According to Kohn, Weil "knows where all the skeletons are buried. Kohn claims that, "Weil can clearly bargain inside information he has that could be embarrassing to American officials or institutions for leniency."

Weil has said in filings with the court that the wrongdoing was committed by people below him, who concealed their own misconduct from Weil. He has also contended that the EBK investigation and decision exonerating Weil confirm that version of events.

=== Arraignment and Trial ===
Charged with conspiracy to defraud the IRS in his appearance before the federal district court in Fort Lauderdale, Florida on 16, December 2013, Weil was released on bail under house arrest with friends in New Jersey by US Magistrate Judge Patrick Hunt. At his January 7, 2014 arraignment, Weil pleaded not-guilty to helping U.S. taxpayers evade taxes on $20 billion in offshore assets.

The trial began in Ft. Lauderdale on October 14, 2014, and the jury found him not guilty on November 3, 2014. Jurors deliberated just over an hour before returning a not guilty verdict. The acquittal is final as prosecution cannot appeal in this case.
