= Dougherty Valley High School =

Public high school in California, United States

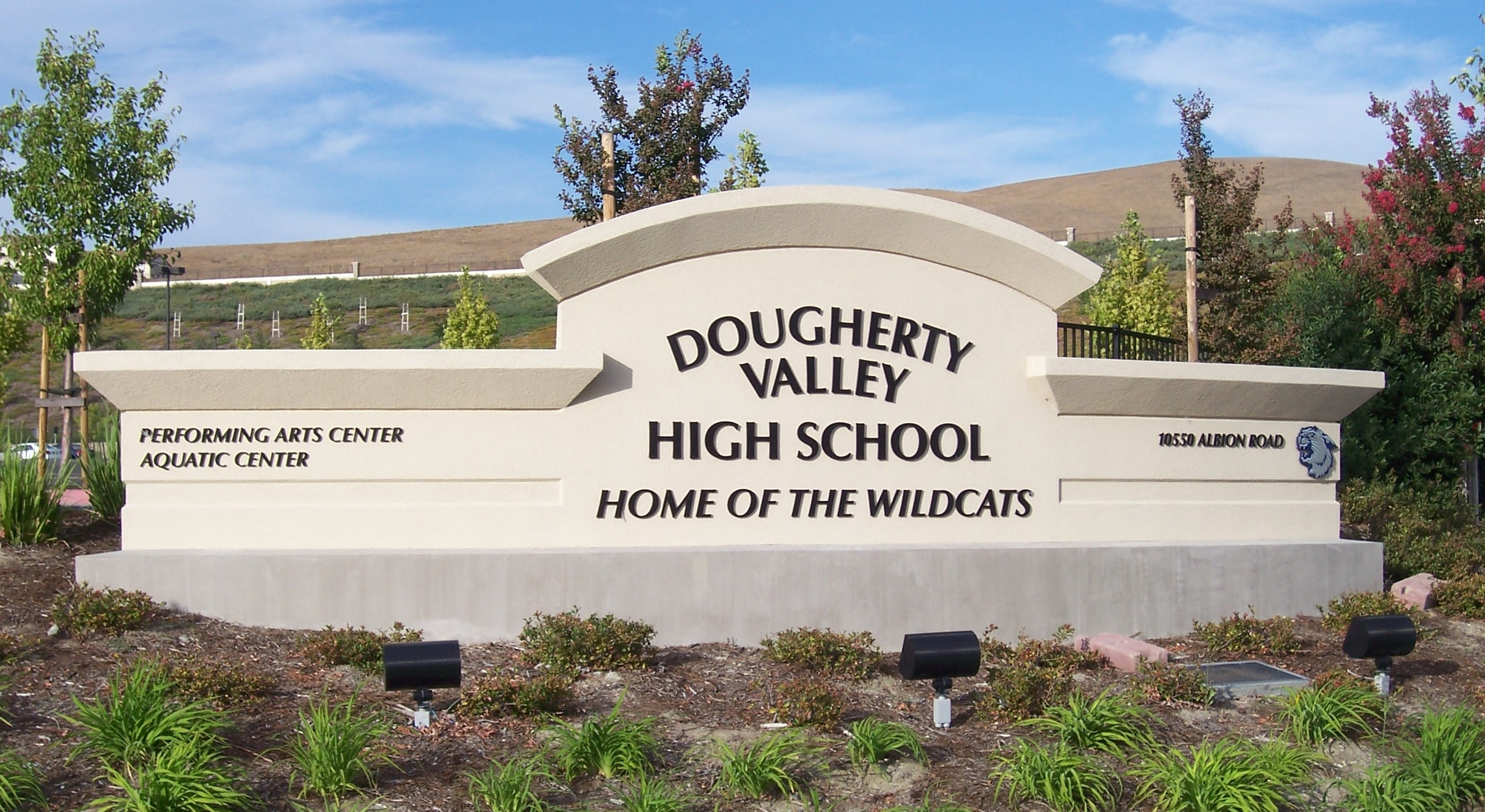

Location
- 10550 Albion Road; San Ramon, California 94582; United States; 37.76944°N 121.90322°W

Information
- Type: Comprehensive public high school
- Motto: Traditions in Excellence
- Established: 2007; 19 years ago
- NCES School ID: 063513011990
- Principal: Lauren Falkner
- Grades: 9-12
- Enrollment: 3,118 (2023–2024)
- Campus size: 54 acres (220,000 m^{2})
- Colors: Navy, Columbia blue, and silver
- Mascot: Willie the Wildcat
- Team name: Wildcats
- Newspaper: Wildcat Tribune
- Yearbook: Triumph
- Website: dvhs.srvusd.net

Dougherty Valley High School is a public high school located in the Windemere development of San Ramon, California, United States. The valley name comes from James Witt Dougherty, a 19th-century landowner and local politician.

It is one of four high schools in the San Ramon Valley Unified School District (SRVUSD), along with California High School, San Ramon Valley High School, and Monte Vista High School. Constructed by Shapell Industries of California and Windemere Ranch Partners BLC, Dougherty was the first developer-built school in the SRVUSD. The school opened its doors in 2007.

Dougherty's mascot is the Wildcats, and its school colors are navy, Columbia blue, and silver. It is known for its state-of-the-art campus, which features a performing arts center and aquatics center in a joint-use agreement with the city. Dougherty is the top school in the district based on Academic Performance Index. The school is also home to over 200 clubs and many after-school activities.

== History ==
=== Conception (1988–2006) ===
The Dougherty Valley mascot is a wildcat.

Dougherty Valley High School was built by Shapell Industries of California and Windemere Ranch Partners BLC, which were also the two main developers of the Dougherty Valley area in general. Shapell was obligated through a December 1988 agreement with the SRVUSD to "contribute its fair share of the cost of additional high school space needed to serve students generated by the project," with the project mentioned being the construction of 11,000 houses in the area. Dougherty is the first developer-built high school in the SRVUSD, in contrast with the typical method of a developer and the state funding the school district for construction of any necessary schools. The district and developers began further negotiations regarding the school's construction in 2001.

The school's name was chosen from more than 150 suggestions submitted to an online survey, although the name, school colors, and mascot had to be approved by the Board of Education. The school logo was designed in 2006 by Jennifer Wong, at the time a senior at Monte Vista High School, after winning a student logo design contest with 12 other entries.

Wong received $500 for her design and was honored alongside the contest's runners-up at a school board meeting. Denise Hibbard, who had been an assistant principal at California High School for six years, was chosen as Dougherty's first principal.

=== Construction (2005–2007) ===
An official groundbreaking at the school was held on September 23, 2005, with school board members Nancy Petsuch, Greg Marvel, and San Ramon Mayor H. Abram Wilson in attendance. The construction of the school was divided into two phases. The first phase, which involved site grading, utilities, and paving, commenced in May 2005 and was completed by January 2006; the second phase, which involved constructing buildings, landscaping and creation of ball fields, commenced in February 2006 and was completed by August 2007. In a December 2006 meeting, the San Ramon city council approved the construction of a performing arts center and aquatics center for joint-use between the city and the SRVUSD. Total construction took 16 months, five months less than predicted.

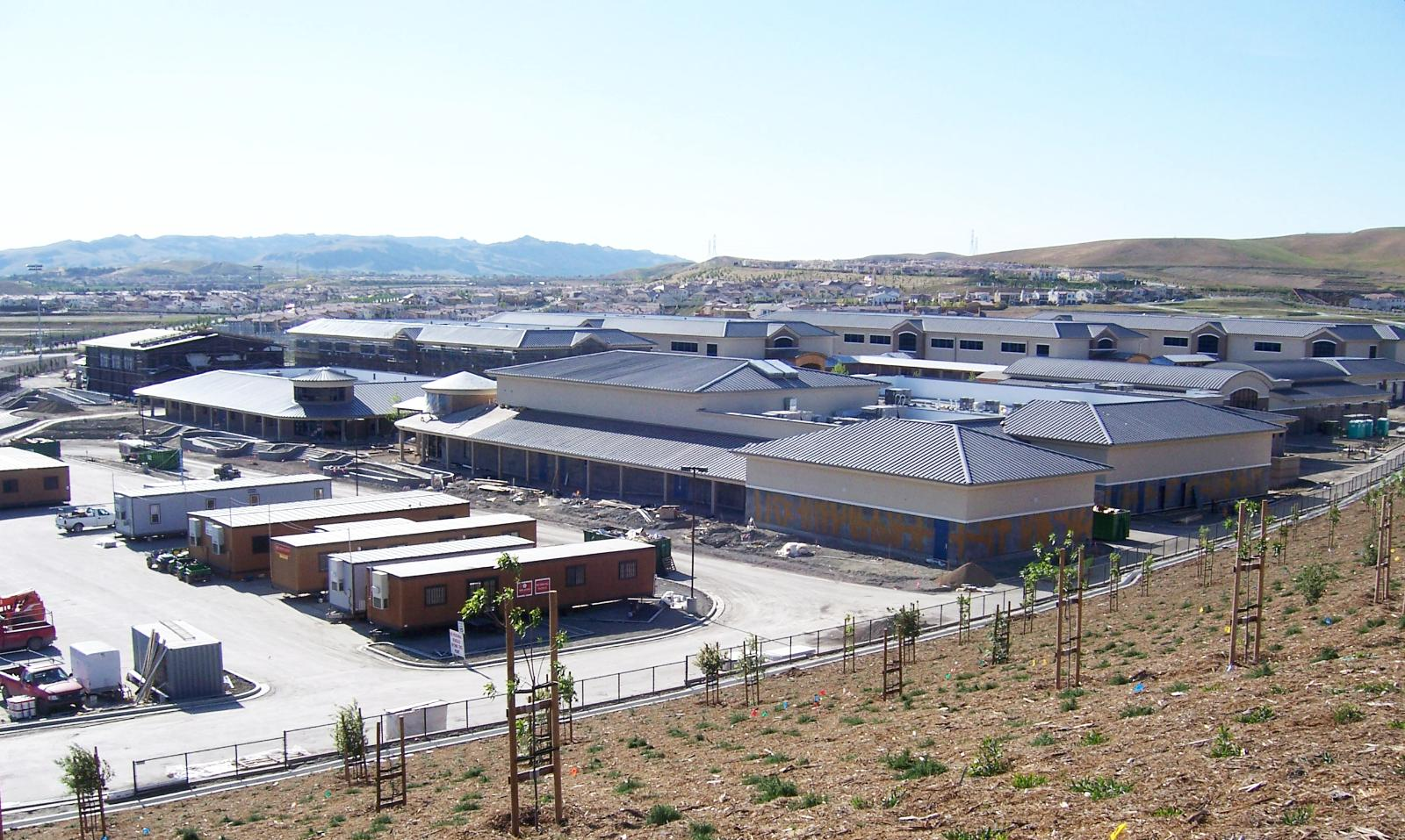
Dougherty Valley High School in May 2007, while still under construction

The construction of the school cost approximately $128 million, and the total cost, including inspections and management, was about $150 million. The costs of the performing arts center, to which the city contributed $4 million, and the aquatics center, to which the city contributed $9.2 million, we're expected to exceed revenues by $400,000 each.

According to city council member Scott Perkins, "Other cities have stand-alone [aquatic] facilities that cost $35 million. We're getting 90 percent of that use for a quarter of the price." In addition, the city approved the $4 million construction of an independent study school on Dougherty's campus, to replace the area's older independent study school built in the 1970s. The expenses of construction were shared between Windemere BLC, Shapell, the school district, and the city of San Ramon.

=== Inauguration and beyond (2007–present) ===
The SRVUSD opened both Dougherty and Live Oak Elementary School on August 25, 2007. Dougherty began its inaugural school year on August 27, 2007, becoming the first high school in 34 years to open in the SRVUSD. History teacher James Corcoran noted that working at the first year school was an opportunity to develop its community, saying "You oftentimes will go into a school as a teacher, or even a principal, and it's 'This is the way we do it around here.' It's hard to change that once it's been set." Elaine O'Hanlon, founding president of the Dougherty Parent-Teacher Association, said that parent volunteering would be encouraged at the new school.

In 2009, the SRVUSD was affected by a major statewide school budget crisis. 236 layoff notices were sent to teachers within the district, more than half of whom worked at Dougherty. All permanent teachers were rehired with the help of a $144 per-parcel tax measure passed in May 2009, expected to raise $6.7 million yearly.

During the 2009 flu pandemic in the United States, one tenth grade student at Dougherty was known to have been infected with the Influenza A/H1N1 virus; however, closure of the school did not occur, as it was found to be unnecessary and inconvenient. According to Principal Hibbard, "We just have to make sure we educate parents", and the school administration reacted to the outbreak by sending out an email to parents with advice from the Centers for Disease Control.

In the summer of 2011, SunPower began construction and installation of solar panels in the school parking lot. The school district used federal funds from low-interest qualified school construction bond as part of government stimulus from the American Recovery and Reinvestment Act of 2009 for the project. When completed, the panels will reportedly provide the school with between two-thirds to 80 percent of its energy needs.

== Enrollment ==
In the 2008–2009 year, 1,001 students were enrolled in Dougherty. Admission is based primarily on the location of students' residency, although birth date documentation and immunization records are also required from new students. The school opened in 2007 with 570 students, fitting the initial prediction of between 450 and 600 students. 95 of these students had transferred to Dougherty from another school in the district, and the majority of the freshmen came from Windemere Ranch Middle School. The school started with only ninth grade freshmen and tenth grade sophomores in 2007, and in each successive school year another grade was added until the standard ninth to twelfth grade range was reached in 2009.

In 2007, Dougherty had 277 female students, representing approximately 48.6% of the total student population, and 293 male students, representing approximately 51.4% of the total student population. Nestled in the culturally integrated Windemere development, Dougherty consists of students from many different backgrounds and is the most diverse in the district. Because of its diversity, San Ramon parks and community services division manager John Skeel said in 2007 that "We know that with the new high school (Dougherty Valley High School) and all the new schools, it's important to stay on top of race issues. With the mixture of middle- and low- income housing in newer neighborhoods, that could be an issue as well." Dougherty's 2007 enrollment included a large population of Asian students, accounting for 41.2% of the student body. 32.5% of the school identified themselves as White, 6.5% as Filipino, 6.1% as African American, 4.9% as Hispanic or Latino, 0.7% as Pacific Islander, 0.2% as American Indian or Alaska Native, and 7.9% with more than one ethnicity or no response.

== Academics ==
Greatschools.com awarded the school a perfect ten out of ten score, based on a comparison between the school's standardized test scores and those statewide; it is one of the few schools in California to be distinguished as such. In 2009, Dougherty had an Academic Performance Index rank of 905 out of a possible 1000, growing from the 2008 base score of 891. The school was the highest ranked high school in the SRVUSD, the 27th highest high school in the state, and the 744th highest school in the country by API score. In 2011, Dougherty Valley improved by 12 points the previous year with an API score of 921, making it the third highest high school in Contra Costa County as well as the top high school in SRVUSD. Dougherty Valley further improved with an API score of 937 in 2012.

In 2013, the school was awarded a gold medal, and ranked among the top 500 schools in the country by U.S. News & World Report.

== School facilities ==
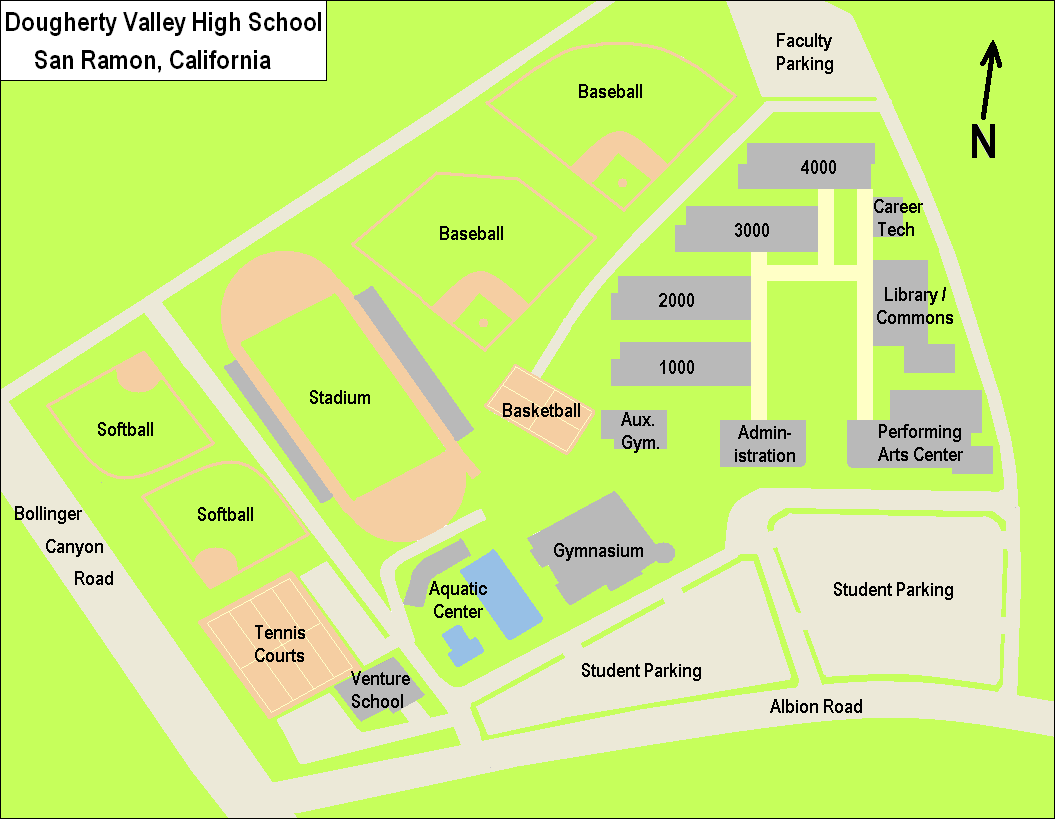
A labeled base map of Dougherty Valley High School

Dougherty occupies approximately 54 acres (220,000 m^{2}) of land and can accommodate up to 2,200 students. Space has been left open to potentially expand the campus in the future, which would allow for 200 more students to attend. Considered to be state-of-the-art, the campus received the award for best of California in the K-12 category for northern California from California Construction magazine.

There are 11 major buildings on campus, including four two-story classroom buildings, a career tech facility, a library, a commons building, an administration building, and two gymnasiums. The school has 80 classrooms. For athletic purposes, the school has a 2,800-seat stadium with lights, a press box, and a track. Also at Dougherty are two baseball fields, two softball fields and eight tennis courts. The campus is home to the area's 11,222 square feet (1,042.6 m^{2}) venture independent study school.

Dougherty shares a performance arts center and aquatics center with the city of San Ramon under a joint-use agreement. The performing arts center includes a 600-seat proscenium theater, a 3,500-square-foot (330 m^{2}) rehearsal room, a box office, lobby, dressing rooms, rooms for vocal and instrumental music, and city offices. In addition to school productions and concerts, alternative rock band Gin Blossoms, stand-up comedian Caroline Rhea, and others have put on shows at the performing arts center. The purpose of the performing arts center in relation to the school is twofold: students are able "to work with some of the professional artists in mentoring and master class programs", and, according to the school's principal, it allows for "larger presentations that can serve all our schools in the area". The aquatics center features a 50-meter Olympic-size swimming pool and locker rooms.

== Extracurricular activities ==
=== Science Bowl ===
The DVHS National Science Bowl team has won multiple regional championships. It has won the regional championship again in 2019 and won the National Science Bowl in 2020.

=== Athletics ===
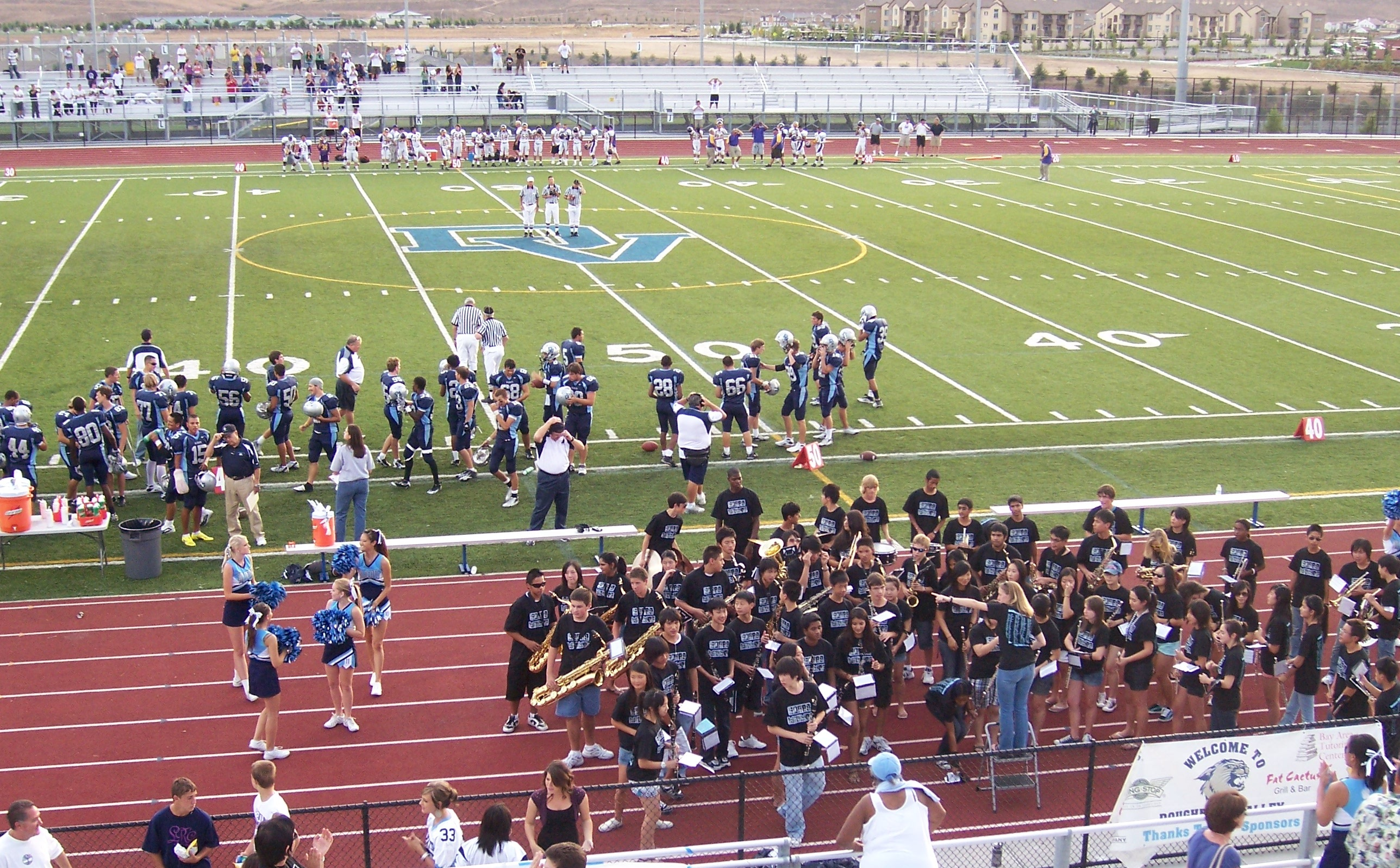
The Dougherty Valley varsity football team on their home field, shortly before a game with John F. Kennedy High School. Members of the varsity cheerleading squad and the Dougherty pep band are also pictured.

The Dougherty Valley Athletic Department offers several sports, including cross country, football, golf, tennis, water polo, volleyball, cheerleading, basketball, soccer, wrestling, baseball, lacrosse, softball, swimming, diving, badminton, and track and field. Most of the sports have separate men's and women's teams, and golf and tennis for men occur in a later season than for women. Current coaches include former Major League Baseball player Darren Lewis for the varsity baseball team.

The school was part of the East Bay Athletic League (EBAL) for its first year, but has since moved to the Diablo Foothill Athletic League (DFAL). Dougherty's main rival is considered to be Dublin High School, due to the close proximity of the two schools and past controversy between the schools' respective coaches. In 2016, Dougherty returned as a member of the East Bay Athletic League.

=== The Wildcat Tribune ===
The Wildcat Tribune is Dougherty's official student newspaper. Published every three weeks in print and updated regularly online features sections on news, editorials, opinions, features, entertainment, and sports.

The Tribune was the first print publication to interview Chesley Sullenberger after the pilot's emergency water landing of US Airways Flight 1549, in a February 2009 special edition of the Tribune with an article titled "Heroism & Humility on the Hudson." Sullenberger and his wife, both residents of San Ramon, decided with CBS to grant his first interview to a student journalist, and Dougherty was attended by one of their daughters. Sullenberger met with the principal and Jega Sanmugam prior to the interview, and all preparation was done in secrecy. Sanmugam conducted the interview at Sullenberger's home hours before Katie Couric interviewed Sullenberger for 60 Minutes. An additional interview with Couric, about her career and the state of journalism, was also published in the Tribune. Alex Clemens, a representative of the Sullenberger family, said: "The Sullenberger family is grateful to CBS for actively demonstrating a commitment to student journalism."

== Notable alumni ==
- Tarun Karumanchi (born 2003), MLS player for the Columbus Crew
- Austin Larkin (born 1995), NFL player for the Atlanta Falcons and Carolina Panthers
- Miri O'Donnell (born 2006), professional soccer player for Sporting CP
- Alyssa Rosenzweig (born 2001), software developer

== Former principals ==
- Denise Hibbard (2007–2011)
- Jason Reimann (2011–2013)
- Daniel Hillman (2013–2016)
- Dave Kravitz (2016–2020)
- Evan Powell (2020–2024)
- Lauren Falkner (2024 – present)
