= Bradley Birkenfeld =

American banker and whistleblower

- Born: Bradley Charles Birkenfeld; February 26, 1965 (age 61); Brookline, Massachusetts, U.S.
- Education: Norwich University; American Graduate School of Business
- Occupation: Private banker
- Known for: 2007 Birkenfeld Disclosure
- Criminal charge: Conspiracy to defraud the United States
- Criminal penalty: 30 months at the FCI Federal Penitentiary and US$30,000 fine

Bradley Charles Birkenfeld (born February 26, 1965) is an American private banker and whistleblower. During the mid- to late-2000s, he made a series of disclosures about UBS Group AG clients, in violation of Swiss banking secrecy laws, to the U.S. government alleging possible tax evasion. Known as the 2007 "Birkenfeld Disclosure", the U.S. Department of Justice (DOJ) announced it had reached a deferred prosecution agreement with UBS that resulted in a US$780 million fine and the release of previously privileged information on American tax evaders.

In the United States, he was convicted by the DOJ for a single charge of fraud conspiracy and served 30 months in a federal penitentiary from 2010 to 2012 with a fine of $30,000. After he applied for whistleblower status and protection, the Internal Revenue Service (IRS) awarded him a settlement of $104 million through their Whistleblower Office.

== Early life and education ==
Birkenfeld was born on February 26, 1965, in Brookline, Massachusetts, a suburb of Boston. His father was a neurosurgeon. Birkenfeld attended Thayer Academy, a prep school, and graduated from Norwich University in Vermont in 1988. Birkenfeld is Jewish; his paternal grandfather Max immigrated to the United States from Romania in 1922. He obtained a master's degree at the American Graduate School of Business in La Tour-de-Peilz, Switzerland.

== Banking career ==
Birkenfeld began his career in banking in the currency trading department of State Street Bank & Trust in Boston. Birkenfeld claims that he first blew the whistle on illegal activities while at State Street, approaching the Federal Bureau of Investigation (FBI) in 1994. The information did not lead to any indictments. He says that he turned down an offer to join the FBI after the incident, but that claim has been disputed. In 1996, he was hired as a private banker at Credit Suisse before moving on to Barclays in 1998. In October 2001, Birkenfeld began working at UBS in Geneva, Switzerland, again as a private banker offering wealth management services. His principal job responsibility was to solicit wealthy Americans to move their assets to the bank, enabling them to hide their funds due to Switzerland's strict banking secrecy laws and thus avoid paying U.S. taxes. According to Birkenfeld, UBS sponsored events like art shows and yacht races in the United States to attract wealthy people as potential clients.

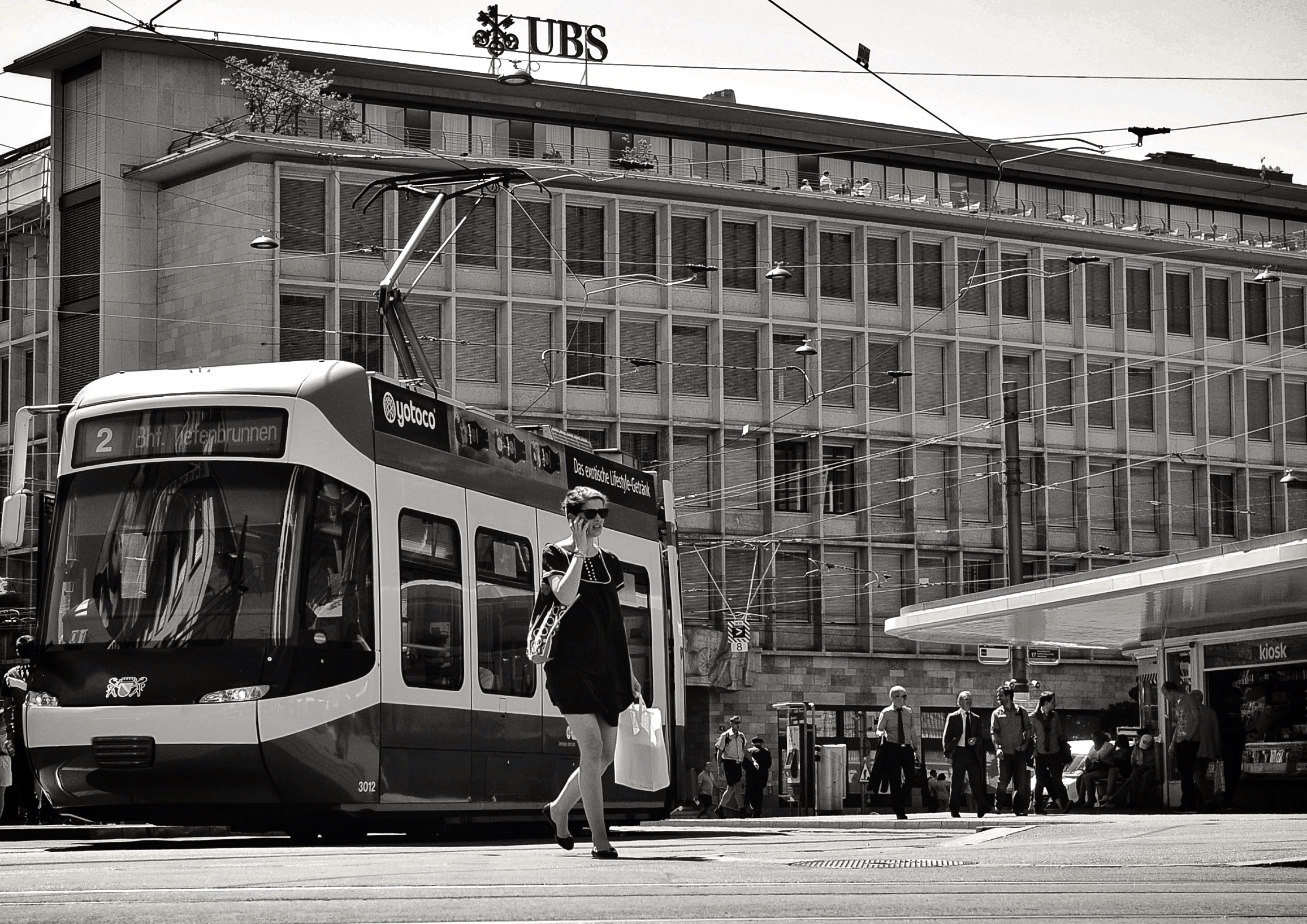
Birkenfeld worked at Swiss investment bank UBS from 2001 to 2005 as a private banker.

=== Birkenfeld disclosure: 2005–2011 ===
In United States

After learning about UBS Switzerland AG dealings in the U.S., Birkenfeld resigned on October 5, 2005 and became a partner at Union Charter Ltd., where he specialized in wealth management. In 2007, he disclosed to the U.S. Department of Justice (DOJ) what he knew about UBS's illegal practices attempting to take advantage the Tax Relief and Health Care Act of 2006, a law that could pay him up to 30% of any tax revenue recouped by the IRS. However, because he did not provide full and complete information to U.S. authorities, Birkenfeld was arrested in Boston on 7 May 2008 when he deplaned from Switzerland and arraigned at the U.S. District Court, Southern District of Florida on 13 May. Birkenfeld resigned his position with Union Charter on 3 June 2008 after agreeing to plead guilty to not disclosing accurate information. As a private banker, Birkenfeld advised California real estate developer Igor Olenicoff, to evade U.S. taxes worth approximately US$200 million. Olenicoff subsequently pleaded guilty to tax evasion and paid a $52 million fine, but avoided a jail sentence. U.S. District Judge William Zloch charged him with a single count of conspiracy to defraud the United States and sentenced Birkenfeld to 40 months in prison and a $30,000 fine. Birkenfeld served his time at the Schuylkill County Federal Correctional Institution from January 2010 to August 2012, approximately 31 months. In 2012, as a consequence of his whistleblower status, the U.S. Internal Revenue Service (IRS) awarded him $104 million, 26% of the total $400 million in taxes returned.

In Switzerland

Birkenfeld is viewed as a criminal and a "traitor" by some members of the Swiss public and banking community as he broke the country's banking secrecy laws. Although he left Switzerland before he disclosed banking client information, had he remained a resident, he would have been prosecuted by Zürich authorities for three and a half years in prison and commensurate fines. When asked if he would ever return to Switzerland, Birkenfeld stated: "I don't believe I will." UBS announced that it would cease providing cross-border private banking services to U.S.-domiciled clients through its non-U.S. regulated units as of July 2008.

After Birkenfeld's award, the Swiss newspaper Blick claimed, “Birkenfeld was a blessing for the Swiss financial industry,” in that his revelations helped accelerate the industry's transition away from its reliance on “dirty” money by dooming the bank secrecy laws that enabled tax evasion.

Birkenfeld has compared the Swiss banking industry with gangsters. "In essence, bank secrecy is analogous to criminal racketeering — and the Swiss government, along with every Swiss private banker, is a co-conspirator."

== Post-banking life: 2015–present ==
Brad Birkenfeld's three-year period of parole ran through November 2015; a year previous Birkenfeld's attorney petitioned the U.S. District Court to allow Birkenfeld to travel abroad.

In January 2015, Birkenfeld was subpoenaed by a French magistrate investigating the abetting of tax evasion and tax fraud by French citizens at UBS. In February 2015, he was allowed to travel to France from 27 February to 1 March 2015 to appear before the French court. The French court is investigating allegations that UBS marketed Swiss numbered bank accounts to French citizens to allow them to hide their assets.

== See also ==
- Tax evasion in the United States
- Banking in Switzerland
