= Kirix Strata =

Specialty desktop database

- Kirix Strata 4.4.2 running on Windows XP
- Developer: Kirix Research LLC
- Stable release: 5.4.0 / May 26, 2025; 6 months ago
- Repository: github.com/kirixresearch/strata
- Written in: C, C++
- Operating system: Windows 10/11, Ubuntu Linux
- Type: Data processing, RDBMS
- License: MIT
- Website: www.kirix.com

Kirix Strata is a specialty desktop database tool designed for data processing and data analytics. Strata includes a range of features to perform data analysis and create reports based on structured data from local files and external relational databases.

Kirix Strata is a free, open source product and is supported on both Microsoft Windows and Linux.

== History ==
Kirix Research is a data analysis software company founded in January 2001. In its early years the company specialized providing data analytic solutions for recovery auditing, including identifying duplicate payments, pricing errors, missed discounts and other overpayment errors in large corporate accounting systems.

In February 2005, Kirix launched Kirix Strata as a new desktop database for Windows and Linux at the LinuxWorld conference in Boston. The product combined some of the capabilities of a spreadsheet with those of a database management system and won the Product Excellence Award in the Best Desktop-Productivity-Business Application category.

In July 2007, Kirix relaunched Strata in beta as a specialty desktop database for working with data from anywhere. Strata was officially released out of beta in April 2008 with the intention of bringing the simplicity of a spreadsheet to the world of tabular data.

== Features ==
Kirix Strata provides tools to view, manipulate and interact with structured data:

- Data Access: Tabular data formats, external databases (e.g., MySQL, PostgreSQL, Oracle) and local data files (e.g., Excel, Access, text-delimited data, and CSV files).
- Data Analysis: Sorts, filters, copies, queries, calculated fields and relationships.
- Reporting
- Scripting and Extensions: Data-enabled version of JavaScript with support for SQL.
- Operating system support:
  - Microsoft Windows 7/10/11
  - Ubuntu Linux 10.04 and later (discontinued in October 2012)
- supports up to 18 exabytes per project; 60 billion records per table; 250 million table per project.
