= Tax evasion in the United States =

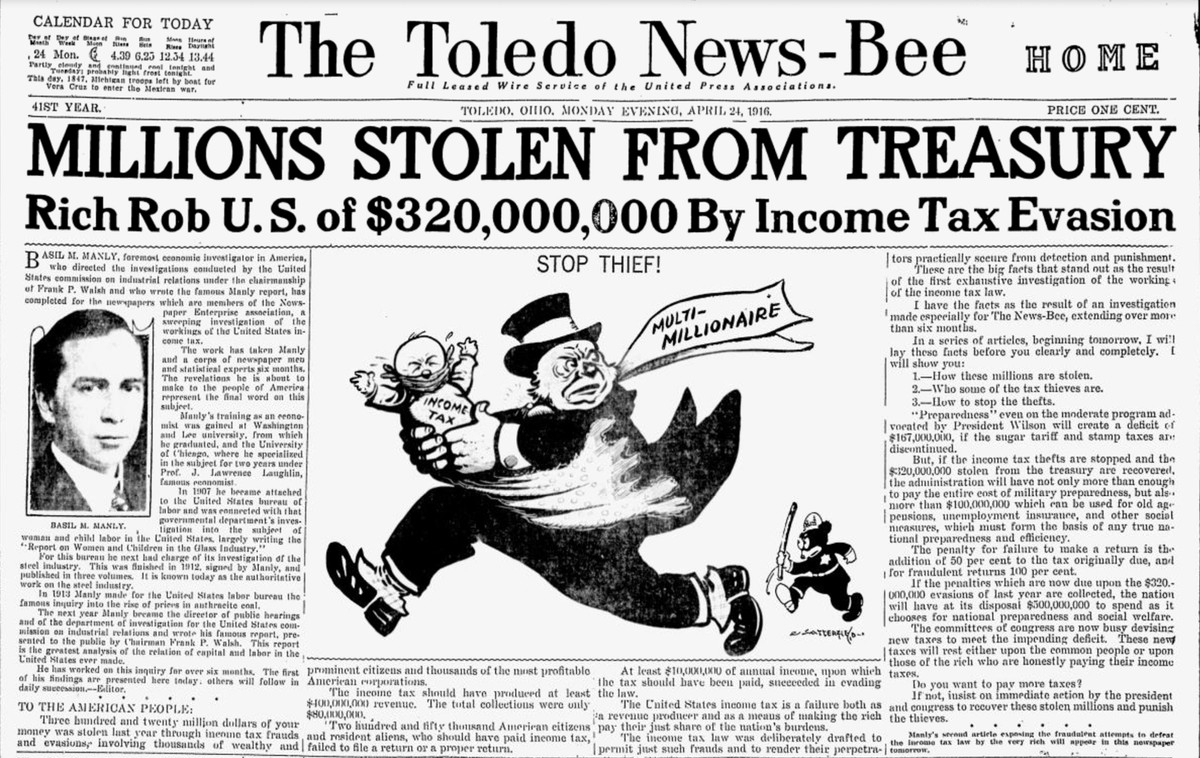
Front page of The Toledo News-Bee, April 24, 1916

Under the federal law of the United States of America, tax evasion or tax fraud is the purposeful illegal attempt of a taxpayer to evade assessment or payment of a tax imposed by Federal law. Conviction of tax evasion may result in fines and imprisonment. Compared to other countries, Americans are more likely to pay their taxes on time and law-abidingly.

Tax evasion is separate from tax avoidance, which is the legal utilization of the tax regime to one's advantage to reduce the amount of tax that is payable by means that are within the law. For example, a person can legally avoid some taxes by refusing to earn more taxable income or buying fewer things subject to sales taxes. Tax evasion is illegal, while tax avoidance is legal.

In Gregory v. Helvering the US Supreme Court concurred with Judge Learned Hand's statement that: "Any one may so arrange his affairs that his taxes shall be as low as possible; he is not bound to choose that pattern which will best pay the Treasury; there is not even a patriotic duty to increase one's taxes." However, the court also ruled there was a duty not to illegally distort the tax code so as to evade paying one's legally required tax burden.

== Definition ==
The U.S. Internal Revenue Code, 26 United States Code section 7201, provides:

Sec. 7201. Attempt to evade or defeat tax

Any person who willfully attempts in any manner to evade or defeat any tax imposed by this title or the payment thereof shall, in addition to other penalties provided by law, be guilty of a felony and, upon conviction thereof, shall be fined not more than $100,000 ($500,000 in the case of a corporation), or imprisoned not more than 5 years, or both, together with the costs of prosecution.

To prove a violation of the statute, the prosecutor must show (1) the existence of a tax deficiency (an unpaid federal tax), (2) an affirmative act constituting an evasion or attempted evasion of either the assessment or payment of that tax, and (3) willfulness (connoting the voluntary, intentional violation of a known legal duty).

A genuine, good faith belief that one is not violating the Federal tax law based on a misunderstanding caused by the complexity of the tax law is a defense to a charge of "willfulness", even though that belief is irrational or unreasonable. A belief that the Federal income tax is invalid or unconstitutional is not a misunderstanding caused by the complexity of the tax law, and is not a defense to a charge of "willfulness", even if that belief is genuine and is held in good faith.

=== The Beginning ===
Money laundering, the term for filtering "dirty money", is believed to have come about when the mafia owned laundromats in the United States. Laundromats had been used to filter large amounts of money from illegal activities, including extortion, alcohol, and prostitution. Through leveraging a legal business, a laundromat, illegal earnings from the following activities could be legitimized as earnings gained by the laundromats. While Al Capone was convicted of tax evasion, it is noted how "his conviction may have been the trigger for lifting the money laundering business off the ground" (Dadoo, 2012; Krishna, 2008; "Al Capone: Biography", 2012). Al Capone, an infamous Prohibition-era crime boss, conducted all of his financial transactions in cash, never having a record of having a bank account. To expand further, the Internal Revenue Service could never find any records of Al Capone purchasing a single security. Despite Capone being behind several casualties during his time spent as the "mafia boss", the federal government was unable to connect any evidence to him. Having said this, the government put a great deal of effort toward collecting evidence of Capone neglecting to pay taxes on his income. Capone was charged with 22 counts of tax evasion but later found guilty of five tax evasion charges (Krishna, 2008; "Al Capone: Biography", 2012). Following Capone's sentencing, Meyer Lansky, often called "The Mob's Accountant", worked to find a better way to get out of paying taxes. Moving forward, Lansky discovered the benefits of Swiss Bank accounts and would become a significant figure for money laundering by using foreign tax havens.

== Occurrence ==
Nearly all Americans believe that cheating on taxes is morally and ethically unacceptable. The voluntary compliance rate (a technical measurement of taxes being paid both on time and voluntarily) in the US is generally around 81 to 84%. This is one of the highest rates in the world. By contrast, Germany's voluntary compliance rate is 68%, and Italy's is 62%.

The Internal Revenue Service (IRS) provides formal definitions: "The gross tax gap is the difference between true tax liability for a given tax year and the amount that is paid on time. It is comprised of the nonfiling gap, the underreporting gap, and the underpayment (or remittance) gap. The net tax gap is the portion of the gross tax gap that will never be recovered through enforcement or other late payments."

The IRS has identified small business and sole proprietorship employees as the most significant contributors to the tax gap between what Americans owe in federal taxes and what the federal government receives. Small business and sole proprietorship employees contribute to the tax gap because there are few ways for the government to know about the skimming or non-reporting of income without mounting more significant investigations.

The willful failures to report tips, income from side-jobs, other cash receipts, and barter income items are examples of illegal cheating. Similarly, those self-employed persons (or those who run small businesses) evade the assessment or payment of taxes if they intentionally fail to report income. One study suggested that the fact that sharing economy firms like Airbnb, Lyft, and Etsy do not file 1099-K forms when participants earn less than $20,000 and have fewer than 200 transactions, results in significant unreported income. A recent survey found that the amount of unreported income for 2016 in the United States numbered at US $214.6 billion, with one in four Americans not reporting the money made on side-jobs.

The typical tax evader in the United States is a male under the age of 50 in a high tax bracket and with a complicated return, and the most common means of tax evasion is the overstatement of charitable contributions, particularly church donations.

=== Foreign tax havens ===
Jurisdictions that allow for limited taxation, known as tax havens, may be used to legally avoid taxes and illegally evade taxes. People can utilize tax havens because many other foreign financial institutions are not held to the same disclosure requirements as those in the United States. This allows people to hide money with the benefit of not needing to provide access to tax information that is required in the United States but not in the tax haven country. Due to laws put in place in tax havens that limit the amount of information to be shared with the United States the overall amount of tax evasion due to tax havens are not able to be reliably estimated. In 2010, the Foreign Account Tax Compliance Act was passed to better enforce taxation in foreign jurisdictions.

=== Illegal income ===
U.S. citizens are required to report unlawful gains as income when filing annual tax returns (see e.g., James v. United States) although such income is typically not reported. Suspected lawbreakers, most famously Al Capone, have been successfully prosecuted for tax evasion when there was insufficient evidence to try them for their non-tax-related crimes. Reporting illegal income as earned legitimately may be unlawful money laundering.

=== Bogus deductions ===
A major type of criminal tax evasion in the United States involves filing false deductions, or deductions for expenses that were never incurred, to lessen the tax penalty.

== Influencing factors ==
=== Imposition of penalties ===
There are two ways penalties on tax evasion are imposed. These penalties can be imposed on undeclared income or evaded tax. Relationships exist between tax rates and tax evasion. An increase in the tax rate will affect tax evasion differently depending on how the penalty is imposed. If the penalty is imposed on undeclared income, there will be a higher rate of tax evasion. If the penalty is imposed on the evaded tax, then the rate of tax evasion can either increase or decrease. The increase or decrease in tax evasion when the penalty is imposed on evaded tax depends on the magnitude of income.

=== Ethical viewpoint ===
A person's ethics can play a big role in committing tax evasion. A person who views the correct representation of income and proper filing of taxes as an ethical decision will lead to more compliance with the tax codes and regulations. A person who does not view the correct representation of income and proper filing of taxes as an ethical decision is more likely to be influenced by factors surrounding them. For example, suppose a family is behind on rent, and the taxpayer does not view properly filling out their taxes as an ethical decision. In that case, they use that outside event to justify evading taxes.

Robert McGee explains the ethics surrounding the act of tax evasion as the "compulsory taking of property by government" (McGee 1994). In simplistic form, taxation represents citizens paying a portion of their income to the government, followed by the government using such funds for external purposes. Whether it be for education, law enforcement, or public parks, each situation shares in the relation of the government receiving money, so-called "property" from the taxpayer. Moving forward, the notion of taxation being "compulsory" stems from the evasion of paying one's taxes, which is illegal. Hence, the government would punish those who engage in tax evasion. Due to the following, tax evasion is seen as unethical because there is no other option but to pay taxes.

Provided that tax evasion is unethical, it is explained that one must have a moral obligation to pay taxes. As noted within the text, "an obligation may be described as 'positive', in the sense that it commands certain actions, while a 'negative' obligation only forbids certain actions". A few positive uses for taxation seen by many may include a contribution to law enforcement or education as these organizations produce a benefit to most members of society. However, the other side of the coin is represented by the negatives, possibly programs funded by many but benefitting very few. This difference truly embeds the climax of ethics for, as noted, "it is impossible to determine which types of public goods are necessary, in which quantity, and which unsatisfied needs of one individual imply the duty of another". It is additionally noted that "one may resort to coercion in order to force other people to share in the costs of the satisfaction of any need one thinks should be satisfied (cite)". To further explain, even if one were to take tax evasion out of the equation, it becomes quite arduous to determine whether allocated tax money meets the needs of the taxpayers. Author John Dryzek is noted within the text for his explanation regarding how "all political arrangements proposed for ensuring that the redistribution of resources within the society fits the preference scales of its members are, by and large, unsatisfactory (Dryzek 2004, pp. 143–155)." As a whole, the major issue that comes along with the ethics of tax evasion stem from whether taxpayer money really serves the payers that make the contributions. Despite taxpayers feeling a moral obligation to pay, many mainly do so as the only alternative is punishment from the government.

== Estimates of lost government revenue ==
U.S. Treasury Department 2019 estimates of unpaid taxes indicate that over half of all unpaid taxes are attributable to the top 5% of earners.

The IRS has provided estimates of the tax gap for 2001 ($345 billion) 2006 ($450 billion), 2008 ($450–$500 billion; unreported income about $2 trillion) 2011–2013 ($441 billion per year) and 2019 (about $600 billion).

According to a 2011 study, about 18 to 19 percent of total reportable income is improperly reported to the IRS.

=== Measurement ===
Beginning in 1963 and continuing every three years until 1988, the IRS analyzed 45,000 to 55,000 randomly selected households for a detailed audit as part of the Taxpayer Compliance Measurement Program (TCMP) in an attempt to measure unreported income and the "tax gap". The program was discontinued in part due to its intrusiveness, but its estimates continued to be used as assumptions. In 2001, a modified random-sampling initiative called the National Research Program was used to sample 46,000 individual taxpayers, and the IRS released updated estimates of the tax gap in 2005 and 2006. However, critics point out numerous problems with the tax gap measure. The IRS direct audit measures of noncompliance are augmented by indirect measurement methods, most prominently currency ratio models

After the TCMP audits, the IRS focused on two groups of taxpayers: those with just a small change in the balance due and those with a large (over $400) change in the balance due. Taxpayers were further partitioned into "nonbusiness" and "business" groups, and each group was divided into five classes based on total positive income. Using line items from the auditor's checksheet, discriminant analysis, and a scoring mechanism, each return was awarded a score known as a "Z-score". Higher Z-scores were associated by IRS personnel with a higher risk of tax evasion. However, the Discriminant Index Function (DIF) system did not provide examiners with specific problematic variables or reasons for the high score, so each filing had to be manually examined by an auditor.

== Investigatory procedures ==
The IRS may conduct investigations to determine the correctness of any tax return and collect necessary income tax, including requiring the taxpayer to provide specific information such as books, records, and papers. The IRS whistleblower award program was created to assist the IRS in obtaining necessary information. While these investigations can lead to criminal prosecution, the IRS has no power to prosecute crimes. The IRS can only impose monetary penalties and require payment of proper tax due. The IRS performs audits on suspicion of noncompliance but has also historically performed randomly selected audits to estimate total noncompliance; the former audits have a much higher chance of noncompliance.

=== Net worth and cash expenditure methods of proof ===
Under the net worth and cash expenditure methods of proof, the IRS performs year-by-year-by-year comparisons of net worth and cash expenditures to identify under-reporting of net worth. While the net worth and cash accrual methods may be used separately, they are often used in conjunction with one another. Under the net worth method, the IRS chooses a year to determine the taxpayer's opening net worth at year's end. This provides a snapshot of the taxpayer's net worth at a particular point in time.

The snapshot includes the taxpayer's cash on hand, bank accounts, brokerage (stocks and bonds), house, cars, beach house, jewelry, furs, and other similar items. Generally, the IRS learns about these items through comprehensive and in-depth investigations, sometimes monitoring the suspected fraudulent taxpayer. In addition, the IRS also assesses the taxpayer's liabilities. Liabilities include expenses such as the taxpayer's mortgage, car loans, credit card debts, student loans, and personal loans. The opening net worth is the most critical point at which the IRS must assess the taxpayer's assets and liabilities. Otherwise, the net worth comparison will be inaccurate.

The IRS then evaluates new debts and liabilities accumulated in the next year and assesses the taxpayer's latest net worth at the end of the following year. In addition, the IRS reviews the taxpayer's cash expenditures throughout the tax year. The IRS then compares the increase in net worth and cash expenditures with the reported taxable income over time to determine the legitimacy of the taxpayer's reported income.

The net worth method was first used in the case of Capone v. United States. The cash method was approved in 1989 in United States v. Hogan.

=== Bank deposit cash expenditure method ===
First approved by the Eighth Circuit in 1935 in Gleckman v. United States, the bank deposit cash expenditure method identifies tax evasion through review of the taxpayer's bank deposits. This method of investigation primarily focuses on whether the taxpayer's total bank deposits throughout the year are equal to the taxpayer's reported income. This method is most appropriate when most of the taxpayer's income is deposited in the bank, and most expenses are paid by check.

This method is most commonly used for surveillance of tipped employees and is combined with statistical analysis to determine what a tipped employee's actual wages are. Information gathered through this method is most successful when the credibility of tipped employees can be destroyed. This method is used less frequently now for tipped employees because the IRS negotiates with hotels or casinos, the largest employers of tipped employees, to identify a tip estimate. If the tipped employee reports the minimal amount agreed upon, he is not questioned by the IRS. However, it is recommended that other methods of proof be corroborated. Given the uncertainty of this method, this method likely could not be used in criminal prosecutions where the guilt must be found beyond a reasonable doubt.

=== Whistleblower program ===
In addition to the methods of proof the IRS has developed, the Tax Relief and Health Care Act of 2006 created the IRS Whistleblower Office, which allows anonymous whistle blowers to receive 15 to 30 percent of any recovery by the IRS which comes to at least $2 million including all penalties, interests and any other monies collected from the government. The whistleblower program seeks information based on evidence and analysis, which can provide a solid basis for further investigation rather than speculation and hearsay.

The program is designed to incentivize ordinary citizens to inform on tax cheats. The program offers far greater incentives for whistleblowers than previous programs because the government was not required to compensate whistleblowers under prior programs. Under this program, taxpayers who do not receive a deserved award may file a lawsuit.

==== Whistleblower Office ====
Established by the Tax Relief and Health Care Act of 2006, the IRS Whistleblower Offices process tips from eligible individuals who spot tax problems in their workplace, their day-to-day personal business, or anywhere else. After determining the degree of credibility, an appropriate IRS office is assigned the case for further investigation. The IRS office assigned varies by the type of issue that the whistleblower alerted it to.

Individuals must meet qualifications to be eligible to receive the reward and must submit Form 211 with supporting documentation to the Internal Revenue Service Office in Ogden, Utah. To claim eligibility, the individual must not be an employee of the Department of Treasury or have been an employee there when they obtained the information, must not have received the information through the individual's official duties as an employee of the federal government, or who received the information based on a contract with the federal government. Whistleblower incidents happen more frequently in the private sector than in the government.

The reward can be worth between 15 and 30 percent of the total proceeds that the IRS collects. To claim the reward, the IRS must move ahead based on the information provided, and the amount identified, including taxes, penalties, and interests, must be worth more than $2 million. A gross income of $200,000 or more is required if the taxpayer is an individual.

The Bipartisan Budget Act of 2018 added subsection 7623(c), which expanded the definition of proceeds for whistleblower awards and was applied to open whistleblower claims. President Trump signed the Taxpayer First Act on July 1, 2019. This law made changes surrounding the notification process to whistleblowers and increased protection against retaliation available to whistleblowers. The legislation's main goal was to improve taxpayer service and ensure that law enforcement was done fairly and impartially, ultimately supporting the nation's continued success.

==== Inadvertent tax evasion ====
Incorrectly filling out tax documents can also be labeled as tax fraud or tax evasion. While these incorrect filings can be due to neglect or lack of knowledge of the tax code, the IRS will take these matters seriously. Just by looking at the documentation, the IRS cannot determine whether the incorrect filing was an unintentional error or done with intent. If it is determined that the error was unintentional, the IRS will apply two common Accuracy-Related Penalties to individuals: Negligence or Disregard of the Rules or Regulations or Substantial Understatement of Income Tax.

Negligence is determined when a reasonable attempt to follow tax laws is not done when preparing tax returns. Disregarding the rules and regulations is classified as When the filer carelessly, recklessly, or intentionally ignores the tax rules and regulations. The penalty for both incorrect filing methods is 20% of the portion of the underpayment of tax.

Substantial Understatement of Income Tax applies when the tax liability is understated by the greater of $5,000 or 10% of the tax required to be shown. The IRS will send a notice letter if an Accuracy-Related Penalty is applicable.

These penalties will be charged interest but can be disputed or removed. The date that interest is charged varies by the penalty but will increase the amount owed until the balance is paid back. If the filer acts in good faith and shows reasonable cause for not meeting the obligation, the IRS can remove the penalty. Interest cannot be reduced or removed unless the penalty is reduced or removed. The IRS offers a toll-free number at the top right corner of the notice letter for the filer to call and dispute. The filer can also write a letter stating their rationale as to why the IRS should reconsider the penalty. When the letter is sent, the filer should include the notice letter, the penalty to be considered, and an explanation for why it should be removed.

== Historical U.S. tax evasion cases ==
The IRS publishes the number of civil and criminal penalties in the IRS Data Book (IRS Publication 55B) and makes these available online. Table 17 shows tabulated data on civil penalties, and Table 18 shows data on criminal investigations. In 2012, the IRS assessed civil penalties in 37,910,493 cases and 4,994,926 abatements. In 2012, the IRS initiated 5,125 investigations; of 3,701 referred to prosecution, 2,634 resulted in conviction. The agency also highlights current investigations on its website by various categories, including abusive returns, tax schemes, corporate fraud, money laundering, and various other categories.

- 1932–1939: Al Capone served seven years of an 11-year sentence in federal prison on Alcatraz Island for tax evasion. He was let out of jail early while suffering from the advanced stages of syphilis.
- 1933: Gangster Dutch Schultz was indicted for tax evasion. Rather than face the charges, he went into hiding.
- U.S. President Harry Truman pardoned George Caldwell, George Berham Parr, and Seymour Weiss for income tax evasion.
- 1963: Joe Conforte, a brothel owner, served two and a half years in prison, convicted for the crime of income tax evasion.
- 1971: Martin B. McKneally (R-NY) was placed on one-year probation and fined $5,000 for failing to file an income tax return. He had not paid taxes for many years prior.
- 1972: Cornelius Gallagher (D-NJ) pleaded guilty to tax evasion and served two years in prison.
- 1974: Otto Kerner Jr. (D) - Resigned as a judge of the Federal Seventh Circuit Court District after conviction for bribery, mail fraud, and tax evasion while Governor of Illinois. He was sentenced to 3 years in prison and fined $50,000.
- 1982: Frederick W. Richmond (D-NY) was convicted of tax evasion and possession of marijuana. Served nine months
- 1985: Joseph Alioto, a lawyer, confessed that he paid no income taxes during the years he served as Mayor of San Francisco.
- 1985–1986: Iran–Contra Affair - Thomas G. Clines was convicted of four counts of tax-related offenses for failing to report income from the operations.
- 1987: Robert Bernard Anderson (R), a former United States Secretary of Treasury (1957–1961), pleaded guilty to tax evasion while operating an offshore bank.
- 1986: Harry Claiborne, Federal District Court Judge from Nevada, was impeached by the House and convicted by the Senate on two counts of tax evasion. He served over a year in prison.
- 1990: Howard Snyder purchased $3.35 million worth of chips in the Trump Taj Mahal and left without paying a single game resulting in a $65,000 fine.
- 1991: Harry Mohney, founder of the Déjà Vu strip club chain, began to serve three years in prison for tax evasion.
- "Matty the Horse" Ianniello (Mafia) was sent to prison for income tax evasion.
- 1992: Catalina Vasquez Villalpando (R), Treasurer of the United States, pleads guilty to obstruction of justice and tax evasion.
- 1993: Sam Roti, nephew of Chicago alderman Fred Roti, was indicted on Federal tax charges, which were later dropped.
- Nicolas Castronuovo owns the Florida pizza parlor where Senator Robert Torricelli was caught on an FBI wiretap soliciting contributions in 1996. Nicolas Castronuovo and his grandson Nicholas Melone later pleaded guilty to evading the government of $100,000 in taxes.
- 1995: Webster Hubbell, (D) Associate Attorney General, pleaded guilty to mail fraud and tax evasion. He is sentenced to 21 months in prison.
- 1996: Heidi Fleiss was convicted of federal tax evasion charges and sentenced to 7 years in prison. After twenty months, she was released to a halfway house with an order to undergo 370 hours of community service.
- 2001: U.S. President Bill Clinton pardoned Marc Rich and Pincus Green, indicted by U.S. Attorney on charges of tax evasion and illegal trading with Iran. Clinton also pardons Edward Downe, Jr., for wire fraud, filing false income tax returns, and securities fraud.
- 2002: James Traficant (D-OH) was convicted of ten felony counts, including bribery, racketeering, and tax evasion. He was sentenced to 8 years in prison.
- 2002: The Christian Patriot Association, an "ultra-right-wing group", was shut down after convictions for tax fraud and tax evasion.
- 2005: Duke Cunningham (R-CA) pleaded guilty to charges of conspiracy to commit bribery, mail fraud, wire fraud, and tax evasion in what came to be called the Cunningham scandal. He was sentenced to eight years in prison.
- 2006: Jack Abramoff, a lobbyist, was found guilty of conspiracy, tax evasion, and corruption of public officials in three different courts in a wide-ranging investigation. He was sentenced to 70 months in prison and fined $24.7 million
- 2008: Charles Rangel (D-NY) failed to report $75,000 income from the rental of his villa in Punta Cana in the Dominican Republic and was ordered to pay $11,000 in back taxes. The House of Representatives voted 333–79 to censure Rangel. It had been 27 years since the last such measure and Rangel was only the 23rd House member to be censured.
- 2008: Senator Ted Stevens (R-AK) was convicted on seven counts of bribery and tax evasion just before the election. He continued his run for re-election but lost. However, before sentencing, the indictment was dismissed—effectively vacating the conviction—when a Justice Department probe found evidence of gross prosecutorial misconduct.
- 2013: Big Four accounting firm Ernst & Young agreed to pay federal prosecutors $123 million to settle criminal tax avoidance charges stemming from $2 billion in unpaid taxes from about 200 wealthy individuals advised by four Ernst & Young senior partners between 1999 and 2004.

Ernst & Young, from 1999 to 2002, was helping wealthy clients avoid paying taxes that led to up to $2,000,000,000 in taxes. They were using fraudulent tax shelters to lower their client's income tax liability without the change in income/assets. The shelters were named "Cobra" and "CDS". These names were used from around 1999 to 2002 and helped 200 clients. They looked like real investments designed to help lower taxes for the clients, but the shelters had no economic substance, and the sole purpose was to reduce taxes illegally. All of the firm's fraudulent shelters were removed in 2003. Ernst & Young paid a settlement to the IRS of $15,000,000 and an additional $123,000,000 in 2013 to settle federal allegations. The government dropped EY from being criminally prosecuted, but the firm needed to abide by strict controls over its tax practice.

KPMG ex-employee David Rivkin lost his job as a partner when a tax evasion scandal led him to plead guilty. He used illegal tax shelters to help lower income tax liability and was the first worker at the firm to confess to doing these criminal acts. These shelters generated false losses of up to $11,000,000,000. This illegal act was in full motion starting in 1999 and ending around 2005. His plea allowed clients to forgo $20,000,000 in taxes, totaling $235,000,000 stolen from the government. This was done through nine clients Rivkin helped. He also promised to help convict the other defendants related to this case. Thirteen defendants who did not plead guilty were dismissed due to the prosecutor's unconstitutional actions. These actions were considered coercion by forcing KPMG not to pay legal fees to defendants, which violated their rights. Four defendants were tried and acquitted of all charges. David Rivkin was the only KPMG employee convicted and punished for the crimes committed and was one of the lesser individuals involved in the whole scandal.

Walter Anderson was involved in the biggest tax evasion case by a single individual that amounted to $365,000,000 in unreported income. The case stated that Anderson avoided paying taxes on $450,000,000 earned, which created a loss of $200,000,000 in government taxes between 1995-1999, but pleaded guilty to a lesser amount. His charges were two counts of tax evasion and one count of defrauding the DOC for failing to report income. He formed new foreign corporations named Gold & Appel and Iceberg Transport but also had foreign bank accounts, none of which were disclosed to the IRS. Anderson tried to hide ownership of these entities that helped earn him $365,000,000 in income. In 1999, Anderson filed a false income tax return for not reporting this income. His sentence was nine years imprisonment with a restitution payment due to the DOC.
