= James Witt Dougherty =

American politician (1813–1879)

James Witt Dougherty (1813–1879) was a Californian politician, rancher, and large landowner during the mid to late 1800s. He, and later his descendants, played an important role in the development of Murray Township in the eastern portion of Alameda County.

James Witt Dougherty was born on April 26, 1813, in Liberty, Tennessee, he operated or owned businesses in Raymond, Mississippi during the 1840s. He ran for Hinds County Sheriff in 1843 but lost the election. He was the county Probate Clerk in 1846. In 1849 he travelled to California, via Panama, as part of the California Gold Rush. By 1850 he and his partner, William Glaskins, were participating in the B. F. Hastings & Company in Sacramento, CA. Newspaper accounts suggest he had, by this time, also worked in or near the gold fields at Grass Valley, California. He returned to Mississippi in 1851 and travelled back to California in 1852 with his family wife, Elizabeth Argyll, and their two children. In December 1852, he and Glaskins, paid Jose Maria Amador $22,000 for approximately 10,000 acres (4,000 ha) centered around what would eventually become Dublin, California. He later bought Glaskins interest in the property and continued to purchase more property in the area. This included buying additional land from Amador.

Soon after the creation of Alameda County in 1853, Dougherty became part of the preliminary county government. In 1855, Murray Township voters elected him to represent them. That same year he became chairman of the Board of Supervisors. Subsequently, he was elected supervisor and served annual terms in 1856, 1857, and 1859. He ran for election in 1861 but lost. He then retired from local politics.

Around 1860 Dougherty added to the economic vitality of the area by having a two-story wooden hotel built at the main intersection of north/south and east west roads in what was then referred to as the community of Dougherty. It competed for business at the crossroads with another hotel, a general store and a blacksmith. The hotel included the local post office after 1860 and Dougherty was the postmaster between 1862 and 1874. Dougherty operated one of the largest ranches in Murray Township (Alameda County) and the 1860 U.S. census reported his land was worth $115,000 and personal property was worth $71,000.

Dougherty died on September 30, 1879. He willed his property to his son, Charles, and his wife Elizabeth, except for some property left to his grandchildren. His estate included 18,000 acres (7,300 ha) (over 28 square miles (73 km^{2})) in and around Dublin in Alameda and Contra Costa counties. The land was valued at $550,000 and other property including crops, hay, implements, and similar items was valued at $160,000.

The Dougherty family’s political prominence and large property holdings resulted in their name being associated with several geographic and social landmarks. Dougherty Valley, Dougherty Road, and Dougherty Valley High School (in San Ramon) are named for James Witt Dougherty or his descendants.
