= Connolly, Inc =

American global-recovery audit firm

Connolly, LLC
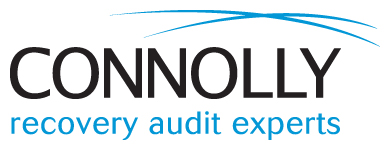
- Company type: Private
- Founded: 1979, USA
- Key people: Libby Connolly Alexander, CEO
- Website: www.Connolly.com

Connolly, LLC (formerly Connolly, Inc.) is a private, global-recovery audit firm with more than 1,200 employees, and two divisions Global Retail and Healthcare. The company is headquartered in Wilton, Connecticut.

== Recovery Auditing ==
Recovery auditing involves recouping the money that companies and government agencies have erroneously paid to suppliers, vendors, and providers. These errors can include duplicate payments, missed discounts, and incorrectly coded medical claims. These types of improper payments are endemic to most large organizations and can range from less than 1% to as much as 8% of expenditures.

== History ==
Connolly was founded in 1979 by James Connolly, a former executive at the Gimbels department store, and was initially known as Connolly Consulting Associates. The company’s initial focus was on retailers, but the business was expanded to non-retailers in the early 1990s, and to healthcare medical claims auditing in the late 1990s. Larry Connolly assumed leadership of the company in 1991, retiring in 2012. Libby Connolly Alexander is the CEO.

== Divisions ==
Connolly’s Healthcare Division serves commercial and government payers in the identification of erroneous healthcare claims. The company has also worked for the Centers for Medicaid and Medicare Services (CMS) as a Recovery Audit Contractor (RAC) since 2005.

Connolly’s Retail Division serves 19 out of the top 20 U.S. retailers.
