= Qualified school construction bond =

Debt instrument for school construction or repair

Qualified School Construction Bonds (QSCB) are a U.S. debt instrument created by Section 1521 of the American Recovery and Reinvestment Act of 2009. The Tax Cuts and Jobs Act of 2017 eliminated QSCB issuances as of January 1, 2018, rendering any unissued allocation void, although all previously issued QSCBs remain valid as long as they are not reissued. There have been some efforts in congress to bring QSCBs back.

Section 54F of the Internal Revenue code covers QSCBs. QSCBs allowed public schools to borrow at a nominal zero percent rate for the rehabilitation, repair and equipping of schools. In addition, QSCB funds could be used to purchase land on which a public school will be built. Depending on the type of payment elected for the QSCB, tax credit or direct pay, the QSCB lender either receives a Federal tax credit in lieu of receiving an interest payment or, for direct pay QSCBs, a direct interest payment from the Federal government. The QSCB rate was set by the IRS each day. The rate paid by treasury on issued bonds was fixed based on the published rate at the time of issue. However, the direct payments are currently subject to a discount on the published rate of payment as a result of the automatic spending cuts required by the 2011 Budget Control Act, P.L. 112-25. The IRS publishes the discount rate applied to QSCB direct pay bonds annually, as of 2021 it was set to 5.7% until 2030.

An annual allocation of $11,000,000,000 was approved for 2009 and 2010 resulting in a total of $22,000,000,000 in QSCB authority. The US Treasury and the IRS allocate the authority to issue QSCBs to all fifty states and US possessions. 60% is allocated to the fifty states and US possessions and 40% is allocated among "large local educational agencies." Some states have provided QSCB and Qualified Zone Academy Bonds allocation to charter schools. The allocation for 2009 was released by the IRS in Notice 2009-35 published in the Internal Revenue Bulletin 2009-17 on April 27, 2009.

Funds were allowed to be used for renovation and rehabilitation projects, as well as equipment purchases, although conservative advice was to avoid use for furniture purchases. QSCBs were also allowed for new building construction and land acquisition. They could not be applied to building acquisition. All state and local laws applicable to bonds also apply to QSCBs, including Section 148 of the IRS Code. QSCBs, like all tax credit bonds, are covered by Section 54 of the Internal Revenue Code. Section 54A provides general guidance for tax credit bonds and was established by Section 15316 of the Food, Conservation and Energy Act of 2008 (Public Law 110-246). Subsequent sections cover specific tax credit bonds and these sections were established as part of the Emergency Economic Stabilization Act of 2008.

54B Qualified Forestry Conservation Bonds
54C Clean Renewable Bonds
54D Qualified Energy Conservation Bonds
54E Qualified Zone Academy Bonds
54F Qualified School Construction Bonds
