= Recovery Audit Contractor =

Recovery Audit Contractor Program
Program overview
- Formed: 2005 (demonstration); January 1, 2010 (permanent, nationwide)
- Jurisdiction: United States
- Parent Program: Centers for Medicare and Medicaid Services (CMS); U.S. Department of Health and Human Services (DHHS)

The Recovery Audit Contractor, or RAC, program was created through the Medicare Modernization Act of 2003 (MMA) to identify and recover improper Medicare payments paid to healthcare providers under fee-for-service (FFS) Medicare plans. The United States Department of Health and Human Services (DHHS) is required by law to make the program permanent for all states by January 1, 2010, under section 302 of the Tax Relief and Health Care Act of 2006.

== History ==
In section 306 of the Medicare Modernization Act of 2003, the United States Congress directed the DHHS to conduct a three-year demonstration program to detect and correct improper payments in the Medicare FFS program. DHHS, through its Centers for Medicare and Medicaid Services (CMS) branch, began the program in 2005, using Recovery Audit Contractors to perform the actual work of reviewing, auditing, and identifying improper Medicare payments. At the inception of the program, it focused on Medicare payments in the states of California, New York, and Florida. The program eventually expanded to Massachusetts and South Carolina before ending in March 2007. By the end of the demonstration, the program had recovered nearly $693.6M on behalf of CMS.

== Jurisdictions ==
The RAC program divides the United States into four jurisdictions (regions A through D), each comprising approximately one quarter of the country, and contracts are awarded for each region. Diversified Collection Services audits region A, CGI Group region B, Connolly, Inc region C, and HealthDataInsights region D. Each RAC may subcontract portions of its region. PRG Shultz subcontracts for portions of regions A, B and D. iHealth Technologies and Strategic Health Solutions are also subcontractors for region A, while Viant is a subcontractor for region C.

RACs are also active in other than government industries. Large players in this field are Connolly, PRGX and Transparent.
