= Austin Larkin =

American football player (born 1995)

No. 62, 96
- Position: Defensive end

Personal information
- Born: April 6, 1995 (age 31); San Ramon, California, U.S.
- Listed height: 6 ft 3 in (1.91 m)
- Listed weight: 265 lb (120 kg)

Career information
- High school: Dougherty Valley (San Ramon)
- College: Notre Dame (2013–2014); City College of San Francisco (2015); Purdue (2016–2017)
- NFL draft: 2018: undrafted

Career history
- Dallas Cowboys (2018)*; San Antonio Commanders (2019); Atlanta Falcons (2019); Carolina Panthers (2020–2022)
- * Offseason or practice squad member only

Career NFL statistics
- Total tackles: 25
- Stats at Pro Football Reference

Austin Blake Larkin (born April 6, 1995) is an American former professional football player who was a defensive end in the National Football League (NFL). He played college football for the Purdue Boilermakers, and played in the NFL for the Atlanta Falcons and Carolina Panthers.

== Early life ==
Larkin attended Dougherty Valley High School, where he played as a middle linebacker, tight end and fullback.

== College career ==
Larkin began his college career as a walk-on at the University of Notre Dame. As a freshman in 2014, he appeared in a single game during the season as a linebacker, but did not record any stats.

He enrolled at the City College of San Francisco for the 2015 season where he was switched to defensive end. As a sophomore, he recorded 38 tackles (17 for loss) and 7 sacks. He contributed to the team winning the 2015 California Community College Athletic Association championship and finishing the season with a 12–1 record. Just hours after finishing a game, Larkin got on a red-eye flight to West Lafayette, Indiana, where Purdue University head coach, Darrell Hazell offered him a scholarship and he accepted.

As a junior in 2016, he appeared in 10 games with 6 starts. He tallied 18 tackles (3.5 for loss) and 2.5 sacks.

== Professional career ==
=== Dallas Cowboys ===
Larkin was signed as an undrafted free agent by the Dallas Cowboys after the 2018 NFL draft on May 11. He was waived on September 1, 2018.

=== San Antonio Commanders ===
In September 2018, Larkin signed with the San Antonio Commanders of the Alliance of American Football. He played with the team until the league folded in April 2019.

=== Atlanta Falcons ===
On May 29, 2019, Larkin was signed by the Atlanta Falcons. He was waived on August 31, and was re-signed to the team's practice squad the next day. Larkin was promoted to Atlanta's active roster on November 23, but was waived three days later and re-signed to the practice squad. He was promoted back to the active roster on December 17, 2019. Larkin was waived on August 4, 2020. He appeared in 2 games, playing 26 snaps on special teams and 10 on defense.

=== Carolina Panthers ===
Larkin had a tryout with the Tennessee Titans on August 22, 2020. He was signed by the Carolina Panthers on August 28. Larkin was waived on September 5, and re-signed to the team's practice squad the next day. He was promoted to the active roster on October 17.

On August 8, 2021, Larkin was waived/injured and placed on injured reserve. He was released on August 17. He was re-signed to the Panthers practice squad on October 27. He signed a reserve/future contract with the Panthers on January 10, 2022.

On August 30, 2022, Larkin was waived by the Panthers and signed to the practice squad the next day. He was released on October 18.

== Personal ==
Larkin is the nephew of former Major League Baseball (MLB) player Barry Larkin.
