= Igor Olenicoff =

American businessman

- Born: 1942 (age 83–84); Moscow, Russia
- Education: University of Southern California (BA & MA)
- Occupation: Businessman
- Known for: Founder, Olen Properties
- Spouse: Jeanne M. Patterson
- Children: 2

Igor Olenicoff (born 1942) is an American billionaire and real estate developer. In 2007, he was convicted of tax evasion stemming from his use of off-shore companies and Swiss banks to hide his financial assets.

== Early life and education ==
Olenicoff was born in Moscow in 1942. After the war, his family, being tsarists, fled the Soviet Union for Iran, where he was educated by missionaries. In 1957, his family emigrated to the United States. In the U.S., his father Michael, an engineer, worked as a janitor, and his mother, Zina, worked as a housekeeper. He graduated from the University of Southern California with an undergraduate degree in corporate finance and mathematics, as well as an M.B.A.

== Olen Properties ==
After school, he worked as a consultant and corporate executive. In 1973, he purchased a 16 unit duplex with his newly founded company Olen Properties. Since then, he has grown the firm and now owns more than 6.4 million square feet of office space and nearly 12,000 residential units in Las Vegas, Arizona, California, and Florida.

In 2006, Forbes Magazine estimated his fortune at $1.6 billion, based upon his sole ownership of Olen Properties. However, Olenicoff told the magazine that he did not own the company, claiming that it was owned by an offshore company–incorporated company since 1980. Olen's offshore corporate parent was first headquartered in the Cayman Islands, the Bahamas and Denmark.

According to Forbes, the IRS was investigating Olenicoff for tax evasion. The IRS contended that Olenicoff was the sole owner of Olen and used Bahamas-domiciled Sovereign Bancorp Ltd. as an offshore vehicle to hide assets from the IRS and his creditors in order to evade taxes. Olenicoff denied he owned Sovereign, claiming that it was a Russian parastatal investment vehicle established by Boris Yeltsin, and that it had merely lent money to Olen. The IRS hit Olenicoff with a $77 million for back taxes and penalties for the years 1996 and 1997 and was investigating him and Sovereign for the 2002 and 2003 tax years.

It was later revealed that Olenicoff was listed on signature cards held by Barclays Bank (Bahamas) as chairman of Sovereign Bancorp and as the president of the National Depository Corporation, Ltd. In 2007, the IRS reported that he also maintained accounts for these two entities at Solomon Smith Barney's British operations, as well as controlled accounts for other offshore companies in Canada and Liechtenstein in which monies from Olen Properties were shifted abroad to avoid taxes.

=== Attempts to block competing housing ===
In 2022, Olenicoff sued Newport Beach to block a competing real estate developer from building an apartment complex near John Wayne Airport. Olenicoff used California Environmental Quality Act to argue that the environmental impact of the development had not been assessed. Housing advocates characterized the Olenicoff lawsuit as "CEQA abuse" and a pretext to block competing housing.

== Tax evasion ==
Olenicoff was ensnared in the UBS scandal, in which the Swiss private bank was revealed to have helped American citizens evade billions of dollars in taxes owed to the U.S. government. Olenicoff was recruited to UBS from Barclays Bank by Brad Birkenfeld, who subsequently blew the whistle on UBS's abetting of tax evasion by wealthy Americans. Olenicoff became a client of UBS in 2001, and transferred $200 million to the bank using credit cards supplied by Birkenfeld.

In December 2007, Olenicoff pleaded guilty to a single felony count of filing a false tax return for 2002. He admitted to tax evasion and of misleading the IRS about his offshore accounts in the Bahamas, Liechtenstein, Switzerland, and the United Kingdom. As part of his plea bargain, Olenicoff paid a $52 million fine and agreed to repatriate his offshore funds to the United States.

In his sentencing on April 14, 2008, Olenicoff blamed his situation on bad financial advice from accountants, bankers, and lawyers and his own thoughtlessness, claiming it was never his intent to defraud the government. On its part, the federal government argued against his serving a prison sentence since he had no prior convictions and his crime had hurt no one financially.

Sentencing guidelines called for a prison sentence of up three years, which typically resulted in a sentence of six months, but the federal prosecutors advised against sending Olenicoff to jail. The U.S. probation officer recommended that Olenicoff receive a sentence of one year on probation, while the prosecutor's memorandum recommended probation for three years. While the prosecutor admitted that Olenicoff had cooperated with the government as per the terms of his plea bargain, he had illegally used off-shore banks to avoid taxes since at least 1992." Assistant U.S. Attorney Brett Sagel argued that a shorter probation period would enable the billionaire to speedily repatriate his assets, which currently were out reach of the IRS.

U.S. District Court Judge Cormac Carney sentenced Olenicoff to two years on probation and 120 hours of community service. The government had not asked for community service. Carney also fined Olenicoff $3,500 and levied a $100 fee on the felon. He sentenced him to two years probation and 120 hours of community service. The judge specified that the community service had to be separate from Olenicoff's charitable activities.

Olenicoff filed a lawsuit against UBS and Birkenfeld in 2008, seeking up to $1.7 billion in damages. Olenicoff alleged that UBS and Birkenfeld had engaged in fraud and conspiracy by giving him bad advice, i.e., that he could avoid paying U.S. taxes by moving his assets to the Swiss bank. American tax law permits residents to have off-shore bank accounts, but they are required to file a Tax Form W9 disclosing the accounts as part of their tax returns.

The suit was dismissed in April 2012, with U.S. District Judge Andrew Guilford acting on a motion by UBS and Birkenfeld to dismiss the suit on the grounds that Olenicoff as a U.S. taxpayer had a duty to know his tax obligations. In his written opinion, Judge Guilford said that Olenicoff since he already pleaded guilty to tax evasion, "It is directly inconsistent for him now to claim that he unwittingly relied on UBS's counsel."

In August 2012, UBS sued Olenicoff under California law for malicious prosecution. The lawsuit quoted Guilford's decision. The complaint claims, "In order to pursue his claim of fraud, he disavowed the sworn statements he made in the criminal case acknowledging his own active deceit, and instead claimed he actually had been unaware that he had lied on his tax returns. This change of his story was done for the purpose of pursuing a false claim of fraud against UBS."

UBS is asking for "special damages" exceeding $3 million plus attorney's fees. Olenicoff publicly responded to the suit by claiming "this is some sort of a publicity stunt to chill anyone else's plans to sue UBS."

== Art forgeries ==
In June 2014, Olenicoff and his real estate company, Olen Properties Corp., were found guilty of copyright infringement by a federal jury and ordered to pay $450,000 in damages to sculptor Don Wakefield, who creates abstract stone sculptures. In 2004, the artist sent emails to Southern California real estate firms, including Olenicoff's real estate company Olen Properties, featuring the image of his amoeba-like sculpture "Untitled" to see if they were interested in purchasing any of his works. In 2008, Wakefield found a similar sculpture at the Newport Beach, California offices of Olen Properties that he initially thought was the original of his "Untitled" work. In 2010, he found three more knockoffs of his works at a property in Irvine, California owned by Olen Properties. The company said the works, which were part of a Percent for Art scheme to promote public art, were the work of Chinese sculptor Zhou Hong.

In 2011, Olenicoff claimed that the sculpture and three others like it that were on display at other Olen sites had been bought in Beijing during the 2008 Olympic Games. Olenicoff also said he had one of the sculptures modified with the addition of a stainless steel form representing a teardrop. At the time, he refused to confirm or deny whether the sculptures were copies of Wakefield's original work. Wakefield's sculpture would cost $160,000 whereas the Beijing-made knockoffs would cost approximately $35,000 each.

Olenicoff also is being sued by sculptor John Raimondi, who was contacted by the real estate tycoon to create versions of two of his extant sculptures as part of a percent-for-art mandate. If Olenicoff had followed through with commissioning the works, Raimondi would have made $100,000 to $250,000. Raimondi had supplied Olenicoff with detailed drawings and photographs of the proposed works, which Olenicof subsequently cancelled. In 2010, Raimondi was informed that sculptures that originally had been submitted to the city of Brea, California as being his works were now credited to a Chinese artist. Raimondi had never authorized the creation or display of the sculptures he had discussed with Olenicoff.

A federal jury in June 2014 awarded Wakefield's $450,000 in damages, whilst another federal jury in December 2014 awarded Raimondi $640,000 in damages. Olenicoff has filed a motion that the damages in the Wakefield case be set aside.

== The "Olenicoff Defense" ==
Lawyers for billionaire H. Ty Warner, the creator of Beanie Babies, successfully used a defense based on the government's treatment of Olenicoff to spare Warner from a jail sentence. Warner had been convicted of illegally hiding $106 million in offshore accounts, which was revealed when he tried to take advantage of the IRS tax amnesty that was offered in the wake of the 2008-10 UBS tax scandal. The lawyers cited Olenicoff for getting off without a jail sentence when he was sentenced for tax evasion via offshore accounts.

Warner's pre-sentencing report that called for a jail sentence said his offshore account was the biggest ever found. In fact, the lawyer's pointed out, Olenicoff had illegally stashed $240 million offshore. The Olenicoff defense worked. On January 14, 2014, District Court Judge Charles P. Kocoras sentenced Warner to two years probation and 500 hours of community service. The judge rejecting the prosecution's recommendation for jail time of one year and one day, to serve as a deterrent to other tax cheats. Olenicoff, who also got two years probation and community service, pleaded guilty to filing a false tax return, a felony. Warner pleaded guilty to the more serious charge of tax evasion.

Since Olenicoff was sentenced in 2008, 63% of those defendants in offshore tax evasion cases have not been sentenced to jail.

== Political activity ==
Olenicoff contributed $24,200 to Donald Trump's 2020 presidential campaign.

== Personal life ==
Olenicoff is married to Jeanne M. Patterson, a Los Angeles native. They have a daughter, Natalia. A son, Andrei, was killed in a car accident in 2005. They live in Lighthouse Point, Florida.

=== Andrei Olenicoff Memorial Foundation ===
Andrei suffered from retinitis pigmentosa and the Olenicoffs founded the Andrei Olenicoff Memorial Foundation in his honor. As of December 2010, Igor Olenicoff was listed as the Newport Beach, California-based private foundation's president. It gave out $37,890 in grants and had assets of $208,859.

The major benefactors of the Andrei Olenicoff Memorial Foundation are the Foundation Fighting Blindness, Guide Dogs for the Blind, and Makapo Aquatics, a visually-impaired paddling team. One of their Foundation's first gifts went to Russian orphans who needed prosthetic devices and corrective surgeries.
