= Recovery auditing =

Recovery auditing is the systematic process of reviewing disbursement transactions and the related supporting data to identify and recover various forms of over payments and under-deductions to suppliers. In other words, it is the recovery of lost money.

== History ==
Recovery auditing was at first primarily for retail based companies. It was developed in the 1970s as a result of companies losing millions of dollars annually because of unpaid invoices, duplicate payments, discounts and allowances not received and general overpayments. Before recovery auditing, this "lost money" was too difficult to identify due to the large amount of transactions processed every year. Companies began investigating deeper into their accounting and found errors in their favor. T

In the United States, two of the largest contributions made by this industry was the Improper Payments Act of 2002 (IPIA) spearheaded by Paul Dinkins and the Medicare Modernization Act of 2003.

== Types of Recovery Audit Services ==
- Accounts Payable
- Contract compliance issues
- Currency mistakes
- Duplicate payments
- Licensing compliance
- Paid credit memos
- Fictitious vendors
- Improperly applied taxes
- Missed cash discounts
- Overpayments
- Pricing errors
- Risk Management
- Shipping errors
- Unclaimed checks

== See also ==
- Recovery Audit Contractor
