= IRS Whistleblower Office =

Branch of United States Internal Revenue Service

Agency overview
- Formed: February 2, 2007
- Jurisdiction: Federal government of the United States
- Headquarters: Washington, D.C. at the Internal Revenue Service Building
- Employees: 43 (2014)
- Agency executive: Director
- Parent agency: IRS
- Website: www.irs.gov/uac/whistleblower-informant-award

The IRS Whistleblower Office is a branch of the United States Internal Revenue Service that will "process tips received from individuals, who spot tax problems in their workplace, while conducting day-to-day personal business or anywhere else they may be encountered." Tipsters should use IRS Form 211 to make a claim.

== History and operations ==
The program has existed since the 1800s in various forms and is intended to uncover companies and individuals who are underpaying their taxes or otherwise committing tax fraud. To motivate people to notify the IRS of first-hand knowledge of tax-evasion schemes, such as improper tax shelters or transfer pricing abuse, the U.S. Congress directed the IRS to pay tipsters at least 15% and as much as 30% of taxes, penalties, and interest collected in cases where $2 million or more is at stake.

=== 2006 Amendments Establishing the Whistleblower Office ===
Section 406 of the Tax Relief and Health Care Act of 2006 and Section 7623(b) of the Internal Revenue Code formally amended the IRS Whistleblower program. Under the amendments passed in 2006, a new set of rules and frameworks were established in order to evaluate informant submissions and to improve the efficiency of the program generally. The amended law also required the creation of the Whistleblower Office within 12 months. The Office lies within the IRS and is charged with administering the new framework and handling potential incoming whistleblower claims. President George W. Bush signed the act on December 20, 2006. U.S. Senator Charles Grassley (R-IA), chairman of the Senate Finance Committee, modeled the act creating the Office and its reward system after the False Claims Act, which allows people to file actions against federal contractors committing fraud against the US government. For fiscal year 2006, the Justice Department reported that over $3 billion was collected directly as a result of Whistleblower claims and resulting lawsuits.

While the Whistleblower Office has the power to assign investigation to other offices within the IRS, it mainly works jointly with other branches within the IRS to investigate claims. The changes to the program through the 2006 amendments were meant to encourage insiders to "blow the whistle on people who are not paying their taxes," in order to close the tax gap and assist the IRS in collecting additional tax revenue. As part of the amendments, Congress created an office within the IRS to handle claims under the IRS Whistleblower program. Part of that act requires the Secretary of the Treasury to conduct annual studies explaining the way in which Section 7623 is used and the results under the program. According to this data, the IRS was able to recover almost $1.2 billion through the program between 2006 and 2010.This increase in collection is credited to the changes in the program from the 2006 amendments. Fiscal year 2011 marked the first payments from the 2006 Amendments and "most of the awards paid during [fiscal year] 2014 resulted from claims under the prior law."

=== Recent Developments ===
On February 2, 2007, the IRS named Stephen A. Whitlock as Director of the new Whistleblower Office.

In 2008, $65 billion in unreported income was alleged by tipsters.

On April 16, 2012, in the Internal Revenue Bulletin, the IRS announced final regulations (Treasury Decision 9580) about rewards and awards to whistleblowers and their representatives. On June 7, 2012, the IRS issued more guidance covering whistleblowers and their representatives. Effective August 1, 2012, the Whistleblower Award Determination Administrative Proceeding procedures and Internal Revenue Manual 25.2.2 have been modified.

According to John McDougal, speaking on his own behalf, at an American Bar Association Section of Taxation webcast, "whistleblower data is the second most important source of information for the IRS's international enforcement efforts." According to McDougal, the primary source of information is through the offshore voluntary disclosure initiative.

=== Section 7623(b) Awards ===
The IRS requires an informant to fulfill several requirements in order to qualify for an award under Section 7623(b). The IRS mandates that informants must provide information that "relate[s] to a tax noncompliance matter in which the tax, penalties, interest, additions to tax, and additional amounts in dispute exceed $2,000,000" and "relate[s] to a taxpayer, and for individual taxpayers only, one whose gross income exceeds $200,000 for at least one of the tax years in question." This information must also "substantially contribute to an administrative or judicial action that results in the collection of tax, penalties, interest, additions to tax, or additional amounts." An informant is not eligible for an award unless the information provides results in IRS administrative or judicial action. Upon meeting these requirements, the IRS will pay the informant fifteen to thirty percent of proceeds collected as a result of the administrative, judicial actions, or other related actions.

The US Internal Revenue Service treats payments made to a whistleblower under the False Claims Act as ordinary income and not as capital gains. The IRS's position was challenged by a relator in a case called Alderson v. United States, and, in 2001, the circuit court upheld the IRS' stance. As of 2013, this remains the only circuit court decision on tax treatment of these payments. The IRS has reported that the percent awarded declines for cases based on information disclosed in public sources or if the whistleblower participated in part or all of the tax noncompliance or underpayment. The amendments allow whistleblowers to appeal award determinations made by the Whistleblower Office to the U.S. Tax Court.

Since 2007, the IRS issued more than $1 billion in awards to whistleblowers, for collection of $6.14 billion from taxpayers, according to a fiscal 2020 report. In 2020, the IRS took an average of nearly 11 years to process 7623(b) claims. In the 2019, the average time to process 7623(b) claims was 10.3 years.

=== Directors ===
Stephen A. Whitlock, February 2, 2007 - August 3, 2015

Lee Martin, August 3, 2015 – May 12, 2022

John Hinman, May 12, 2022 - present

== Awards ==
In its 2013 Annual Report, the IRS stated that it paid $53 million in awards to 122 whistleblowers for information which led to the recovery of $367 million in unpaid taxes. As of July 16, 2012, in 2012 fiscal year, the Whistleblower Office has approved over 90 awards.

The IRS Whistleblower Office announced that in fiscal year 2020, 169 whistleblowers were awarded a total of $86 million. Since the Office was founded, it has awarded more than $1.01 billion and collected $6.14 billion “in back taxes, interest, penalties, and criminal fines and sanctions.”

In September 2012, the IRS Whistleblower Office awarded Bradley Birkenfeld a $104 million whistleblower award for providing information about more than $5 billion in unpaid taxes from banks and individuals.

In October 2012, IRS Whistleblower Office awarded $38,037,899 to one corporate whistleblower but "the amount of tax the IRS collected from the company was not revealed" and "name of the company" was not revealed. That same month, the office awarded a "$2 million reward to a whistleblower who exposed an alleged tax avoidance scheme by Illinois Tool Works, Inc. (ITW) that cost the U.S. Treasury hundreds of millions of dollars".

Amounts Collected and Awards Paid under IRC section 7623 FY 2008-2012 (as of 9/30/2012)
	2008	2009	2010	2011	2012
Cases Received	3,704	5,678	7,577	7,471	8,634
Awards Paid	198	110	97	97	128
Collections over $2,000,000	8	5	9	4	12
Total Amount of Awards Paid	$22,370,756	$5,851,608	$18,746,327	$8,008,430	$125,355,799
Amounts Collected	$155,985,834	$206,032,872	$464,695,459	$48,047,500	$592,498,294
Awards paid as a percentage of amounts collected	14.3%	2.8%	4.0%	16.7%	21.2%

== Oversight of Whistleblower Office ==
The Whistleblower Executive Board is composed of:

1. Director of the Whistleblower Office, chairperson
2. Assistant Deputy Commissioner for Services and Enforcement, member
3. Deputy Commissioners of the Large Business and International (LB&I) Division, member
4. Deputy Commissioner and the Small Business/Self-Employed (SB/SE) Division, member
5. Deputy Chief of Criminal Investigation, member
6. Division Counsel for LB&I, member
7. Division Counsel for SB/SE, member

The Whistleblower Operations Committee is composed of:

1. Program Manager, Case Development of the Whistleblower Office, chairperson
2. its members include senior managers from:

- LB&I,
- SB/SE, and
- the Whistleblower Office and Criminal Investigation

== Internal Whistleblowers ==
Notable internal IRS whistleblowers include Gary Shapley and Joseph Ziegler. They testified publicly in 2023 to Congress about claims that the U.S. Department of Justice limited a tax investigation into Hunter Biden, and their allegations that they were not free to pursue leads that may have implicated his father, President Biden.
