= Qualified Zone Academy Bonds =

Qualified Zone Academy Bonds (QZABs) are a U.S. government debt instrument created by Section 226 of the Taxpayer Relief Act of 1997. It was later revised and regulations may be found in Section 54(E) of the U.S. Code. The Tax Cuts and Jobs Act of 2017 eliminated QZABs as of January 30, 2018. QZABs allowed certain qualified public schools to borrow at nominal interest rates (as low as zero percent) for public school renovation costs as well as for costs incurred in connection with the establishment of special programs in partnership with the private sector.

== History ==
The normal annual allocation had been $400,000,000. However, during 2008, 2009, and 2010, the American Recovery & Reinvestment Act (ARRA) increased these amounts to 1.4 billion. The 2011 allocation returned to the $400,000,000 level. The allocation was divided up by all fifty states and US possessions. QZABs are a temporary program, subject to reauthorization. The last authorization was for the calendar years 2012 and 2013. Authorizations must be used within two years following the year for which they were given, meaning that authorizations given in 2012 must be used by December 31, 2014. As of July 21, 2014, the reauthorization of the QZAB program for years 2014 and 2015 has not been passed by the U.S. Congress.

The Tax Cuts and Jobs Act of 2017 eliminated QZABs as of January 30, 2018, rendering any unissued allocation void, although all previously issued QZABs remain valid.

== Qualification ==
Public schools (K-12) located in empowerment zones or enterprise communities and public schools with 35% or more of their student body on the free and/or reduced price lunch programs are eligible to participate.

In order for a school district or charter school to participate, a Zone Academy must be created or documented. The Zone Academy must create programs to enhance the curriculum, increase graduation rates, improve employment opportunities, and better prepare students for the workplace or higher education.

Funds could be used only for renovation and rehabilitation projects (including energy projects), as well as equipment purchases (including computers). QZAB proceeds could not be used for new building construction. The school district or charter school was required to obtain evidence of matching funds from a private-sector/non-profit partner equal to at least 10% of the cost of the proposed project.

"Pay to play" contributions were prohibited. Set up fees, discounts on equipment purchased with QZAB funds, or contributions associated with the district’s construction projects were also not eligible.

The IRS began investigating QZABs, and, more specifically school districts that purchased donations. Several large schools were found to have spent nearly as much on the setting up the required zone academies, as the contributors match. Attorneys discovered that far from being a true donation, companies providing academies were in fact charging large setup fees or annual expenses to "maintain" their academy. (Citation Needed - IRS Cases are typically not public). Districts found with these invalid donations were required to repay the bond investor's the lost tax-credit, penalties to the IRS, and retire their bonds.

All state and local laws applicable to bonds also apply to QZABs, including Section 148 of the IRS Code. A qualified lender as defined by the law must purchase bonds. Qualified lenders can be insurance companies, some banks or other corporations actively engaged in lending (each qualifying entity is determined by the Internal Revenue Code governing each). The lender receives a tax credit in lieu of interest payments from the school. The amount of the tax credit was set at issuance via rates published daily by the Treasury prior to January 2018.

Many QZABs were issued for public school renovations prior to their January 2018 cancelation referenced above.

The renovation of Oak Ridge High School in Oak Ridge, Tennessee has been partially funded by $8 million in QZABs. Matching funds to qualify for QZAB funding were provided through private donations.

The renovation of Warren County School District in Warren County, Pennsylvania and Lehighton Area School District in Lehighton, PA were both funded by $39 and $9.5 million QZAB's respectively. Matching funds to qualify for QZAB funding were provided through donations (including 10% match and Academy) from the National Education Foundation and State University of New York (SUNY).
