= Tax Relief and Health Care Act of 2006 =

US law

- Long title: An act to amend the Internal Revenue Code of 1986 to extend expiring provisions, and for other purposes
- Enacted by: the 109th United States Congress
- Effective: 4 January 2007

Citations
- Public law: Pub. L. 109–432 (text) (PDF)
- Statutes at Large: 120 Stat. 2922

Codification
- Titles amended: 12, 15, 16, 19, 25, 26, 29, 30, 42, 43

Legislative history
- Introduced in the House as H.R. 6111 by Ellen O. Tauscher (D–CA) on 19 September 2006; Committee consideration by Ways and Means; Passed the House on 5 December 2006 (Voice); Passed the Senate on 7 December 2006 (Unanimous Consent) with amendment; House agreed to Senate amendment on 8 December 2006 (367 - 45) with further amendment; Senate agreed to House amendment on 9 December 2006 (79 - 9); Signed into law by President George W. Bush on 20 December 2006

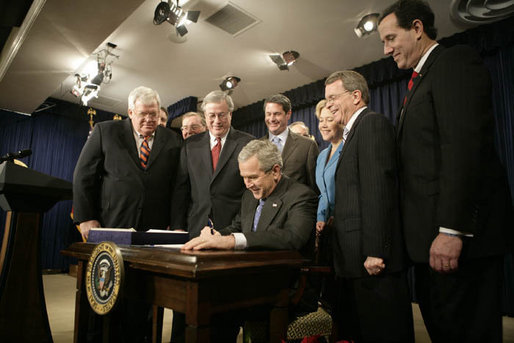
President Bush signs the act into law

The Tax Relief and Health Care Act of 2006 (Pub. L. 109–432 (text) (PDF), 120 Stat. 2922), includes a package of tax extenders, provisions affecting health savings accounts and other provisions in the United States.

== Tax provisions ==
=== Extenders ===
The Act retroactively extended for two years (through December 31, 2007) certain provisions that had expired at the end of 2005, including:

- Above-the-line deduction for qualified tuition and higher education expenses
- Elective itemized deduction for state and local general sales taxes (in lieu of a deduction for state and local income taxes)
- Research credit
- For tax years ending after December 31, 2006, the Act also modifies the rules for calculating the research credit: it increases the rates of the alternative incremental credit and creates a new alternative simplified credit
- Work opportunity tax credit, welfare-to-work tax credit
- Tax credit for Qualified Zone Academy Bonds
- Up to $250 above-the-line deduction for certain expenses of elementary and secondary school teachers
- Expensing of brownfields remediation costs
- Tax incentives for investment in Washington, DC
- Indian employment tax credit
- Accelerated depreciation for business property on Indian reservations
- Fifteen-year depreciation for qualified leasehold improvements and qualified restaurant property
- Enhanced charitable deductions—for corporate donations of scientific property used for research, and of computer technology and equipment
- Archer medical savings accounts
- Suspension of the taxable income limit on percentage depletion for oil and natural gas produced from marginal properties

In addition, the Act extended (through December 31, 2007) certain provisions that would otherwise expire at the end of 2006, including:

- Election to treat combat pay as earned income for purposes of calculating the earned income credit
- Provisions affecting IRS disclosure of certain tax return information

The Act extended the new markets tax credit through the end of 2008 and requires that future regulations ensure that non-metropolitan counties receive a proportional allocation of qualified entity investments.

The Act extended through December 31, 2008, numerous energy provisions that would otherwise have expired at the end of 2007, including:

- Tax credit for electricity produced from certain renewable resources
- Authority to issue clean renewable energy bonds
- Deduction for energy-efficient commercial buildings
- Tax credit for new energy-efficient homes
- Tax credit for residential energy-efficient property

== Health savings account provisions ==
Several provisions affect health savings accounts (HSAs), including provisions dealing with limitations on HSA contributions and tax-free rollovers to HSAs from health reimbursement accounts, flexible spending accounts and individual retirement accounts.

== Other provisions ==
Other provisions include:

- Expansion of the Section 199 domestic production activity deduction to income from Puerto Rico, if all Puerto Rican receipts are subject to federal income tax
- A refundable credit of 20 percent of the long-term unused alternative minimum tax credits per year for the next five years, subject to certain limitations and phaseouts
- Enhancing reporting requirements for the exercise of incentive stock options and employee stock purchase plans
- Reform and expansion of whistleblower awards to certain individuals who provide information regarding violations of the tax laws
- An increase of the penalty for frivolous tax submissions from $500 to $5,000 and an extension of the scope of the penalty
- A temporary itemized deduction for qualified mortgage insurance premiums accrued during 2007, subject to limitations and phase-out
- Increased information sharing between the IRS and certain regional governmental organizations
- Charitable remainder trusts having unrelated business taxable income are subjected to an excise tax equal to 100% of unrelated business taxable income
- A technical correction to the Subpart F look-through rule under the Tax Increase Prevention and Reconciliation Act of 2005
- Clarifying that the Tax Court has jurisdiction to review requests for equitable innocent spouse relief
- Expanding the Medicare Recovery Audit Contractor program to all 50 states and making it permanent
- Ordering the completion without delay of the All-American Canal Lining Project and identifying a 1944 treaty between the US and Mexico as the exclusive authority concerning the impacts of projects constructed within US territory on foreign territories

The Act makes permanent certain provisions that were included as temporary provisions in the Tax Increase Prevention and Reconciliation Act of 2005 and were otherwise scheduled to expire after 2010, including:

- Federal income tax exemption of certain qualified settlement funds established to resolve CERCLA claims
- "Separate affiliated group" rule for satisfaction of active trade or business requirement under Section 355
- Election to treat self-created musical works as capital assets
- Exemption from imputed interest rules for certain loans to qualified continuing care facilities
