= Kohan =

Kohan may refer to:

== People ==
- Kohan (surname)
- Kōhan Kawauchi (1920–2008)

== Places ==
- Kohan, Kerman, a village in Kerman Province, Iran
- Kohan, Semnan, a village in Semnan Province, Iran
- Gaz Kohan
- Kohan Chenar
- Pir Kohan
- Rob-e Kohan

== Companies ==
- Kohan Retail Investment Group, a shopping mall investment company in the United States

== Other uses ==
- Kohan: Immortal Sovereigns, a 2001 video game

== See also ==
- Cohan
- Kohen (disambiguation)
