= Kohn =

Kohn is a surname. It may be related to Cohen. It may also be of German origin. Notable people with the surname include:

- Aaron M. Kohn, crime investigator and FBI agent
- Alfie Kohn (born 1957), American lecturer and author
- Arnold Kohn (1905–1984), Croatian Zionist and longtime president of the Jewish community Osijek
- Avrohom Yitzchok Kohn (1914–1996), Hasidic rabbi
- Bernard Kohn (born 1931), French-American architect
- Charlotte Kohn (born 1948), Austrian journalist
- Dan Kohn-Sherbock, American-British Jewish theologian
- David Kohn (1838–1915), Russian archaeologist
- Donald Kohn (1942), American economist, former Federal Reserve Vice Chair
- Eugene Kohn (1887–1977), American rabbi
- Fritz Kortner (born as Fritz Nathan Kohn) (1892–1970), Austrian-born stage and film actor
- Hans Kohn (1891–1971), American philosopher and historian
- Howard and Clara Kohn (1861–1933) and (1899–1988), American cattle ranchers
- Joseph J. Kohn (1932–2023), Czech-American mathematician
- Ladislav Kohn (born 1975), Czech hockey player
- Matt Kohn (born 1981), American football player
- Michael Kohn (born 1986), American major league baseball pitcher
- Mike Kohn (born 1972), American bobsledder
- Milton Kohn (1912–2001), American architect and holocaust collector
- Ralph Kohn (1927–2016), British medical scientist and benefactor of music
- Robert D. Kohn (1870–1953), American architect
- Robert V. Kohn (1953–2026), American mathematician
- Sigurd Køhn (1959–2004), Norwegian jazz saxophonist and composer
- Sonja Kohn (born 1948), Austrian banker
- Walter Kohn (1923–2016), Austrian-American theoretical physicist and Nobel laureate
- Yetta Kohn (1843–1917), German-American businesswoman and rancher

== See also ==
- KOHN, FM radio station operated by the Tohono O'odham Nation, Arizona, USA
- Cahn
- Coen (disambiguation)
- Cohan
- Cohn
- Cohen
- Coyne
- Kahn
- Kohan
- Kohen
- Kuhn
