= Kogan =

Kogan (Russian: Ко́ган) is a Russian spelling variant of the Jewish surname Cohen.

- Aleksandr Kogan, several people
- Artur Kogan (born 1974), Israeli chess master
- Belle Kogan (1902–2000), American industrial designer
- Boris Kogan (1940–1993), Russian-American chess master
- Dmitri Kogan (1978–2017), Russian violinist
- Herman Kogan (1914–1989), American journalist
- Jacob Bernstein-Kogan (1859-1929), Russian physician, Zionist, and Jewish community activist
- Jacob Kogan (born 1995), American actor
- Jonathan Kogan, member of the band Area 11
- Lazar Kogan (1889–1939), Soviet secret police functionary
- Leonid Kogan (1924–1982), Soviet violinist
- Marcio Kogan (born 1952), Brazilian architect
- Michael Kogan (1920–1984), Russian businessman
- Nataly Kogan, Russian-born American author and entrepreneur
- Nathan Kogan (1926–2013), American psychologist
- Pavel Kogan (disambiguation), several people
- Pyotr Kogan (1872–1932), Russian literary historian, philologist, literary critic and university professor
- Richard Kogan (physician)
- Ruslan Kogan (born 1982), Belarusian-Australian entrepreneur, founder and director of Kogan Technologies
  - Kogan.com, Australian retail and services group founded by Ruslan Kogan
- Yosif Arkadyevich Kogan, birth name of Osip Yermansky (1867–1941), Russian Menshevik economist
- Rita Kogan (born c. 1976), Russian-born Israeli poet
- Valentina Kogan (born 1980), Argentine handball player
- Zvi Kogan (1996-2024), Israeli-Moldovan rabbi killed in the United Arab Emirates

== See also ==
- Cohn
- Kagan (disambiguation)
- Kaganovich (disambiguation)
- Cohen (and its variations) as a surname
- Y-chromosomal Aaron, the "Cohen" gene
- Yevgeni Koganov
- Komarovsky
