= Cohen (disambiguation) =

Cohen is a surname.

Cohen may also refer to:

== People ==
- List of people with surname Cohen
- Cohen (given name)

== Arts, entertainment, and media ==
- Cohen vs. Rosi, an Argentine romantic comedy film
- Matt Cohen Prize, an award given annually by the Writers' Trust of Canada to a Canadian writer
- Shaughnessy Cohen Award, a Canadian literary award

== Other ==
- The Cohen Building of The Judd School in Tonbridge, England

== See also ==
- Coen (disambiguation)
- Cohan
- Cohn
- Cohon (disambiguation)
- Kagan (disambiguation)
- Kahane
- Kahn
- Kohn
- Kohen, a Jewish priest
