= Coan (surname) =

Coan is a surname. Notable people with the surname include:

- Andy Coan (1958–2017), U.S. swimmer
- Bert Coan (1940–2022), U.S. American football player
- Blair Coan (1883–1939), U.S. government agent
- Ed Coan (born 1963), U.S. powerlifter
- Frederick G. Coan (1859–1943), U.S. Christian missionary
- Gil Coan (1922–2020), U.S. baseball player
- Jack Coan (born 1998), American football player
- Jim Coan (born 1969), U.S. psychologist and neuroscientist
- Maud Coan Josaphare (1886–1939; born Maud Josephine Coan), U.S. educator
- McKenzie Coan (born 1996), U.S. swimmer
- Nigel Coan, Uk animator
- Olayr Coan (1959–2007), Brazilian actor
- Sarah Eliza Coan (1843–1916), Hawaiian clubwoman
- Stephen M. Coan, U.S. environmentalist
- Titus Coan (1801–1881), U.S. Christian missionary

== See also ==
- Coan (disambiguation)
- James Carlile McCoan (1829–1904), Irish politician
- Coen (name)
- Cohen (surname)
