= Cahan =

Cahan may refer to:

- Cahan (surname)
- Cahan, Orne, a commune of the Orne département in France

== See also ==
- O'Cahan, a clan in Ulster
- Kahan (disambiguation)
- Kagan (disambiguation)
- Kaganovich (disambiguation)
