= Kahane =

Some people named Kahane include:

- Anetta Kahane, German journalist
- Binyamin Kahane, Israeli Air Force pilot
- Binyamin Ze'ev Kahane, founder of the Israeli Kahane Chai party
- Brianna Kahane (born 2002), American child prodigy violinist
- Elisabeth Ann Kahane, American photographer
- Gabriel Kahane, American composer, pianist and singer-songwriter
- Henry R. Kahane, Romance philologist
- Howard Kahane, professor of philosophy known for promoting a popular approach to logic
- Jack Kahane (1887–1939), Manchester-born writer and publisher
- Jackie Kahane, Polish-Canadian stand up comedian
- James S. Kahane, French-German conductor
- Jean-Pierre Kahane (1926–2017), French mathematician
- Jeffrey Kahane, American pianist and conductor
- Meir Kahane, founder of the American Jewish Defense League and the Israeli Kach party
- Nachman Kahane, rabbinic scholar involved in the renewal of the Sanhedrin; author of a commentary on the Tosafot

The name is the Aramaic equivalent of kohen.

== See also ==
- Cohen (surname)
- Kohen, a direct male descendant of the biblical Aaron, brother of Moses
- Cohen (disambiguation)
- Coen (disambiguation)
- Cohn
- Kahana (disambiguation)
- Kahan
