= Kaghani =

Kaghani may refer to:

- something of, from, or related to the Kaghan Valley of northern Pakistan
- Kaghani goat, a breed of goat

== See also ==
- Kaghan (disambiguation)
