= Kahan =

Kahan may refer to:

== Places ==
- Kahan, Pakistan, a village and tehsil in Balochistan, Pakistan
- Kahan, Iran, a village in Razavi Khorasan Province, Iran
- Kahan Godar, a village in Hormozgan Province, Iran
- Kahan, Kuhbanan, a village in Kerman Province, Iran
- Kahan-e Pain, a village in Razavi Khorasan Province, Iran
- Kowhan, Tiran and Karvan, also known as Kahān, a village in Isfahan Province, Iran

== People ==
- Arcadius Kahan, American historian
- Barbara Kahan, British social worker
- Bente Kahan, Norwegian singer and actress
- Dan Kahan, American professor of law
- Ed Kahan, IBM executive
- Henry O. Kahan, American lawyer and politician
- Herman Kahan, Norwegian businessman, rabbi, author, and Holocaust survivor
- Judith Kahan, American actress and writer
- Kahan Singh Nakai, Nakai Misl leader
- Louis Kahan, Australian artist
- Maksim Kahan, Israeli sports shooter
- Marcy Kahan, British playwright and radio dramatist
- Marius Kahan, English musician
- Nathan Kahan, Belgian runner
- Noah Kahan, American singer
- Rebecca Bauer-Kahan, American attorney and politician
- Richard Kahan, Canadian actor and writer
- Scott I Kahan, American physician
- Steve Kahan, American actor
- William Kahan, Canadian mathematician
- Yitzhak Kahan, Israeli judge
- Zelda Kahan, British communist

== Other uses ==
- Jane Kahan Gallery, an art gallery in New York City
- Kahan summation algorithm, a mathematical algorithm attributed to William Kahan
- Kahan Commission, an Israeli investigation into the Sabra and Shatila Massacre in Lebanon
- Paden–Kahan subproblems, a mathematical problem in inverse kinematics

== See also ==
- Kahane, a surname (including a list of people)
- Kahanism
- Cahan (disambiguation)
