= Coan =

Coan may refer to:

- Coan (surname), including a list of people with the name
- Argentine Naval Aviation (Spanish: Comando de la Aviación Naval, COAN)
- a person or thing from Kos, Greece
  - Coan wine
- Coan, Virginia, U.S.
- Coan River, Virginia, U.S.

== See also ==
- CO (disambiguation)
- Coa (disambiguation)
- Coen (disambiguation)
- Koan (disambiguation)
- Coan Baptist Church, Heathsville, Northumberland County, Virginia, USA
- Coan Middle School, Atlanta, Georgia, USA
- Lhen Coan, Isle of Man
  - Lhen Coan railway station
- James Carlile McCoan (1829-1904), Irish politician
