= Kagan (surname) =

Kagan is a primarily Russian-Jewish surname which is derived from the surname Cohen (in Russian the consonant h is replaced with the consonant g).

Notable people with the Kagan surname include:

- Anatol Kagan (1913–2009), Russian-Australian architect
- Ari Kagan (born 1967), American politician from New York City
- Benjamin Kagan (1869–1953), Russian geometer
- Bernhard Kagan (1866–1932), German chess player and writer
- Carolyn Kagan (born 1960), British community psychologist and activist
- Cherie Kagan (born 1969), American nanotechnologist and academic
- Cheryl Kagan (born 1961), American politician
- Daniel Kagan (born 1953), American politician from Colorado
- Daryn Kagan (born 1963), American broadcast journalist
- David Kagan (born 1949), American Catholic bishop
- Donald Kagan (1932–2021), American historian and classicist
- Edgard Kagan, American diplomat
- Elena Kagan (born 1960), American Supreme Court associate justice
- Emily Kagan (born 1981), American mixed martial artist
- Frederick Kagan (born 1970), American academic and think tank member, brother of Robert Kagan
- Henri B. Kagan (born 1930), French chemist
- Helena Kagan (1889-1978), Israeli pediatrician
- Jakub Kagan (1896–1942), Polish-Jewish jazz musician and composer
- Janet Kagan (1946–2008), American novelist
- Jeremy Kagan (born 1945), American film director
- Jerome Kagan (1929–2021), American psychologist
- Jonathan C. Kagan, American immunologist and academic
- Joseph Kagan, Baron Kagan (1915–1995), British industrialist
- Kimberly Kagan (born 1972), American military historian, wife of Frederick Kagan
- Marilyn Kagan (1951–2020), American actress
- Michael Kagan (born 1944), American actor
- Michael Kagan (artist) (born 1980), American artist
- Michael G. Kagan, American academic, lawyer and activist
- Mimi Kagan (1918–1999), American dancer and choreographer
- Oleg Kagan (1946–1990), Soviet violinist
- Paul Kagan (1943–1993), American photographer, graphic artist and author
- Rachel Cohen-Kagan (1888–1982), Israeli politician
- Richard Kagan (born 1943), American historian
- Richard C. Kagan (born 1938), American historian and activist
- Robert Kagan (born 1958), American columnist and historian, brother of Frederick Kagan
- Rod Kagan (1940–2010), American sculptor
- Sarah H. Kagan, American nursing academic
- Shelly Kagan (born 1956), American philosopher
- Shimon Kagan (1942–2024), Israeli chess player
- Vladimir Kagan (1927–2016), American furniture designer
- Vyatcheslav Kagan-Paley (born 1964), Belarusian singer
- Yisrael Meir Kagan (1838–1933), Belarusian rabbi

== See also ==
- Kaganovich
- McKagan
- Kagen (surname)
