= Kogon =

Kogon may refer to:

- Kogon (surname)
- Kogon, Uzbekistan, a city in the Bukhara region
- Emperor Kōgon (Japanese: 光厳天皇, Kōgon-tennō) (1313–1364), the 1st of Ashikaga Pretenders during the Period of the Northern and Southern Courts in Japan
- Emperor Go-Kōgon (Japanese: 後光厳天皇, Go-Kōgon-tennō) (1336–1374), the 4th of the Ashikaga Pretenders during the Period of the Northern and Southern Courts.

== See also ==
- Kohon
- Kogan
