= Cohn =

Cohn is a Jewish surname (related to the last name Cohen). Notable people and characters with the surname include:

- Al Cohn (1925–1988), American jazz saxophonist, arranger and composer
- Alan D. Cohn, American government official
- Alfred A. Cohn (1880–1951), American screenwriter
- Alice Cohn (1914–2000), German graphic artist
- Art Cohn (1909–1958), American sportswriter, screenwriter and author
- Arthur Cohn (1927–2025), Swiss film producer
- Arthur Cohn (rabbi) (1862–1926), Swiss Orthodox rabbi
- Arthur Cohn (1894–1940), mathematician known for Cohn's irreducibility criterion
- Avern Cohn (1924–2022), United States District Court judge
- Bernard Cohn (anthropologist) (1928–2003), anthropologist and scholar of British colonialism in India
- Bernard Cohn (politician) (1835–1889), American businessman and politician in Los Angeles
- Brian Cohn, American politician
- Craig Cohn (b. 1983), birth name of American professional wrestler Craig Classic
- Clementine Cohn (born 1861), German writer
- Daniel Cohn-Bendit (b. 1945), French-German politician
- Dan Cohn-Sherbock (b. 1945), Jewish theologian
- David Cohn (b. 1995), American-Israeli player in the Israeli Basketball Premier League
- Edwin Joseph Cohn (1892–1953), American scientist
- Emil Cohn (1854–1944), German physicist
- Erich Cohn (1884–1918), German chess master
- Ernst Max Cohn (1920–2004), American philatelic researcher and expert
- Falk Cohn (1833–1901), German rabbi
- Ferdinand Cohn (1828–1898), German biologist
- Gary Cohn (b. 1960), American investment banker
- Gary Cohn (comics) (b. 1952), American comic book writer
- Gary Cohn (journalist) (1952–2024), American journalist
- Gertrud Cohn (1876–1942), German victim of the Nazi regime
- Gretta Cohn, American cellist and podcast producer, CEO of Pushkin Industries
- Gustav Cohn (1840–1919), German economist
- Harry Cohn (1891–1958), American co-founder of Columbia Pictures Corporation
- Harvey Cohn (1884–1965), American track and field athlete
- James Cohn (1928–2021), American composer
- Joan Cohn (née Joan Perry), the widow of Harry Cohn
- Joseph Judson Cohn (d. 1996), MGM producer, founder of J.J. Cohn Estate
- Lawrence H. Cohn (1937–2016), American cardiac surgeon and researcher
- Leonie Cohn (1917–2009), German-born BBC Radio producer
- Leopold Cohn (author) (1856–1915), German author and philologist
- Leopold Cohn (Christian clergyman) (1862–1937), Hungarian-American minister and evangelist
- Linda Cohn (b. 1959), American sportscaster
- Marc Cohn (b. 1959), American singer-songwriter
- Mariano Cohn (b. 1975), Argentine TV and film director
- Marthe Cohn (1920–2025), French author, nurse, spy and Holocaust survivor
- Mathilda Cohn (1798–1877), birth name of Finnish and Swedish concert singer Mathilda Berwald
- Mindy Cohn (b. 1966), American actress, comedian and singer
- Nate Cohn, American journalist
- Nik Cohn (b. 1946), British rock journalist
- Norman Cohn (1915–2007), British historian
- Norman Cohn (1907–1972), birth name of American saber fencer Norman C. Armitage
- Oskar Cohn (1869–1934), German politician
- Paul Cohn (1924–2006), British mathematician
- Priscilla Cohn (1933–2019), American philosopher and animal rights activist
- Rebecca Cohn (b. 1954), American politician
- Robert Cohn (b. 1949), Canadian business executive, founder of Octel Communications
- Robert Cohn, a character in Ernest Hemingway's 1926 novel The Sun Also Rises
- Ronald Cohn (1943–2022), American zoologist, co-founder of The Gorilla Foundation
- Roy Cohn (1927–1986), American lawyer
- Ruth Cohn (1912–2010), German-born psychotherapist, educator, and poet
- Waldo Cohn (1910–1999), American biochemist

== See also ==
- Coen (disambiguation)
- Cohen (surname)
- Cohen (disambiguation)
- Kahane
- Kohen, a direct male descendant of the Biblical Aaron, brother of Moses
