= Cohen =

Surname of Jewish, Samaritan, and Biblical origins

Cohen (Hebrew: כֹּהֵן, romanized: kōhēn, lit. 'priest') is a surname of Jewish, Samaritan and Biblical origins (see: Kohen). It is a common Jewish surname, and is the most common surname in Israel.

== Origin ==
Bearing the surname often (although not always) indicates that one's patrilineal ancestors were priests in the Temple of Jerusalem. Although not all Kohenic lines stem from Aaron, the brother of Moses, he is generally regarded as the patriarch of the lineage and the first Kohen. A single such priest was known as a Kohen, and the hereditary caste descending from these priests is collectively known as the Kohanim. As multiple languages were acquired through the Jewish diaspora, the surname acquired dozens of variants. Not all persons with related surnames are kohanim, and not all kohanim have related surnames.

Some Kohanim have added a secondary appellation to their surname, so as to distinguish themselves from other Kohanim—such as Cohen-Scali of Morocco, who trace their lineage to Zadok, and Cohen-Maghari (Meguri) of Yemen, who trace their lineage to Jehoiarib, one of the priestly divisions.

Being a Kohen imposes some limitations: by Jewish law a Kohen may not marry a divorced woman and may not marry a proselyte (someone who converted to Judaism). Nor should an observant Kohen come into contact with the dead or enter a cemetery unless for the death of a close relative.

An effort to test whether people named "Cohen" have a common genetic origin has been undertaken, using a genealogical DNA test associated with the Cohen Modal Haplotype (see Y-chromosomal Aaron). Y chromosome research has shown that Cohanim predominantly share a common ancestry, regardless of geography, a finding that agrees with common Jewish origins in the Near East. In contrast, for the caste of Levites, indications are that it has multiple origins.

== Variants and derivations ==
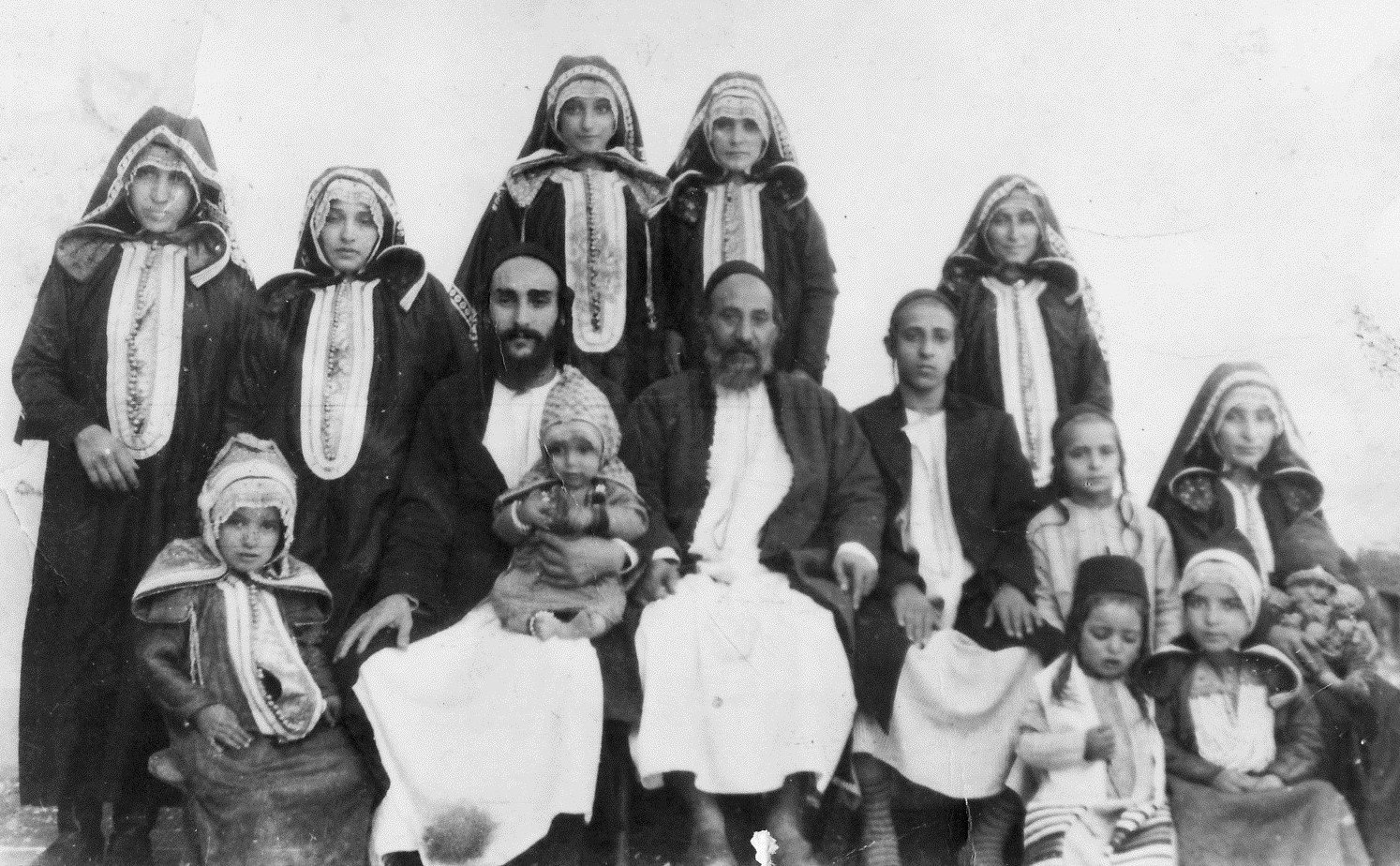
The Suleiman ben Pinhas al-Cohen family of Sana'a, circa 1944

Some Jewish immigrants to the United States or the United Kingdom changed their name from Cohen to Cowan (sometimes spelled "Cowen"), as Cowan was a Scottish name. In Ireland, Coyne is also a similar replacement. The name "Cohen" is also used as a given name.

- Cahn
- Cahen
- Coen
- Cohan
- Cohn
- Kahane (Aramaic for kohen)
- Kahanow/Kahanov/Kakhanov/Kokhanov
- Kahn
- For some bearers, the surname Katz may stem from "Kohen Tzedek", meaning "righteous or authentic priest."
- Kohn
- Kon (surname) Polish variant
- Kagan (surname) (transliterated from Russian)
  - Kaganovich (disambiguation)
  - Kogan
  - Kogen (disambiguation)
  - Kogon (surname)
- Ancient/Modern Hebrew: Kohen, HaKohen, ben-Kohen, bar-Kohen, (Sephardic Portuguese variants) Cunha, Coina, Coinha
