= Qaghan =

Qaghan or Khagan (Old Turkic: 𐰴𐰍𐰣, romanized: qaɣan; Mongolian: хаан, romanized: khaan) is a title of imperial rank in the Turkic and Mongolic languages equal to the status of emperor and someone who rules a khaganate (empire).

Qaghan may refer to:

- Bumin Qaghan (a.k.a. Bumın Kagan) or Illig Qaghan, (died 552 AD), the founder of the Turkic Khaganate
- Issik Qaghan, the second ruler of the Turkic Khaganate (552-553)
- Muqan Qaghan, the second son of Bumin Qaghan and the third khagan of the Göktürks. Ruled 553 – 572
- Taspar Qaghan or Tatpar Qaghan, the third son of Bumin Qaghan and Wei Changle, and the fourth khagan of the Turkic Khaganate (572–581)
- Ishbara Qaghan (before 540 – 587), the first son of Issik Qaghan, grandson of Bumin Qaghan, and the sixth khagan of the Turkic Khaganate (581–587)
- Apa Qaghan, son of Muqan Qaghan, declared himself qaghan of the Turkic Khaganate and reigned: 581–587
- Bagha Qaghan, the seventh ruler of the Turkic Kaganate (587–589)
- Niri Qaghan, ruler of the Western Turkic Khaganate (587-599)
- Heshana Qaghan (died 619), a khagan of Western Turkic Khaganate (604-612)
- Yami Qaghan (?–609), personal name Ashina Jankan, a khagan of Eastern Turkic Khaganate, known in some point as Tolis Qaghan
- Tong Yabghu Qaghan was khagan of the Western Turkic Khaganate from 618 to 628
- Illig Qaghan, later Tang posthumous title Prince Huang of Guiyi, the last qaghan of the Eastern Turkic Khaganate
- Tolis Qaghan (603–631), personal name Ashina Shibobi, son of Shibi Qaghan, a khagan of Eastern Turkic Khaganate when the khaganate was defeated and became a vassal of Tang dynasty.
- Ilterish Qaghan (died 692) was the founder of the Second Turkic Khaganate (reigning 682–692)
- Qapaghan Qaghan (664-716) or Qapghan Qaghan, the second Khaghan of the Second Turkic Khaganate during Wu Zetian's reign and was the younger brother of the first kaghan, Ilterish Qaghan
- Inel Qaghan or Inel Khagan, a ruler of the Second Turkic Khaganate (716)

Kaghan

- Bilge Khagan (683–734), the khagan of the Second Turkic Khaganate (717–734)
- Oghuz Khagan or Oghuz Khan, a legendary and semi-mythological khan of the Turks

== See also ==
- Kagan (disambiguation)
- Kaghan (disambiguation)
- Qaghans of the Turkic khaganates
- Khagan Bek, the title used by the bek (generalissimo) of the Khazars
