= Kaganovich =

Kaganovich is a surname; notable people with the surname include:

- Ida Rosenthal (born Ida Kaganovich, 1886–1973), Russian-American dressmaker, businesswoman
- Lazar Kaganovich (1893–1991), Soviet politician
- Mikhail Kaganovich (1888–1941), Soviet politician
- Der Nister (1884–1950), pen name of Pinchas Kaganovich (Kahanovich), a Yiddish author, philosopher, translator, and critic

== See also ==
- Kagan (disambiguation)
- Kogen (disambiguation)
- Kogon (disambiguation)
- Kogan (disambiguation)
