= Kogan (disambiguation) =

Kogan is a Russian version of the Jewish surname Cohen, which denotes the descendants of the high priests of ancient Israel.

Kogan may also refer to:

- Kogan.com, an Australian portfolio of retail and services businesses
- Kogan, Queensland, a town in Australia

== See also ==
- Kohen (disambiguation)
- Cohen (disambiguation)
