= Kaghan =

Kaghan may refer to:

- Khagan or Qaghan, a Turkic and Mongolian title
- Kaghan Valley, a valley in the Khyber-Pakhtunkhwa Province of Pakistan
- Kaghan (town), a town in Khyber-Pakhtunkhwa, Pakistan
- Theodore Kaghan, American civil servant and journalist

== See also ==
- Kagan (disambiguation)
- Qaghan (disambiguation)
- Kahgan, a village in Iran
