= Kagen (surname) =

Kagen is a surname. Notable people with the surname include:

- David Kagen (born 1948), American film and television actor
- Jonah Kagen (born 2000), American singer, songwriter and musician
- Lesley Kagen, American novelist
- Sergius Kagen (1909–1964), American pianist and composer
- Steve Kagen (born 1949), American politician from Wisconsin

== See also ==
- Kagan (surname)
- Kage (disambiguation)
