= House of Cards (Cohan book) =

Book by William D. Cohan

House of Cards: A Tale of Hubris and Wretched Excess on Wall Street
- Hardcover edition
- Author: William D. Cohan
- Language: English
- Subject: Corporate History, Finance, Financial crises, Investment banking
- Publisher: Doubleday
- Publication date: March 10, 2009
- Publication place: United States
- Media type: Print (hardback)
- Pages: 468 pp.
- ISBN: 0-385-52826-4
- Preceded by: The Last Tycoons
- Followed by: Money and Power

House of Cards: A Tale of Hubris and Wretched Excess on Wall Street is the second book written by William D. Cohan. It was released on March 10, 2009 by Doubleday, and primarily discusses the American investment firm Bear Stearns.

== Overview ==
The book chronicles the history of Bear Stearns, from its founding in 1923 to its fire sale to JPMorgan Chase in 2008, following the subprime mortgage crisis. It also gives the reader an inside glance of Bear Stearns senior management and the company's growth into the fifth largest investment firm, before its collapse.

The book documents the rise of Alan "Ace" Greenberg, and his unsuccessful power struggle with bridgemaster and bond trader James Cayne, the power struggle between "co-presidents" Warren J. Spector & Alan Schwartz, and the recklessness of the over-leveraged hedge fund supervised by Richard A. Marin and Ralph R. Cioffi. The text also tells the story of Salim Lewis.

== Recognition ==
The book was on the long list for the 2009 Financial Times and Goldman Sachs Business Book of the Year Award. Tim Rutten characterized the book as a "masterfully reported account", and credited the author with a "remarkable gift for plain-spoken explanation."
