= Cohan =

- Language: English

Origin
- Languages: Irish, Hebrew

Other names
- See also: Cohen, Coyne

Cohan is a surname of Irish origins. It is a variant of Cohane, which itself is an Anglicized form of the Irish Ó Cadhain, making Cohan a Gaelic contraction of "from Cadhain".

Cohan is also a variant spelling of the Hebrew surname Cohen, commonly found among French Jews.

Notable people named Cohan include:

- Chris Cohan (born 1950), owner of the Golden State Warriors of the NBA
- Don Cohan (1930–2018), American Olympic bronze medal winner in sailing
- George M. Cohan (1878–1942), American entertainer (member of Four Cohans)
- Helen Cohan (1910–1996), American stage dancer, film actress
- Lauren Cohan (born 1982), English-American actress
- Peter Cohan, American businessman
- Robert Cohan (1925–2021), British-American dancer and choreographer
- Ryan Cohan (born 1971), American jazz pianist and composer
- William D. Cohan (born 1960), American business writer

== See also ==
- Coulonges-Cohan, a commune in the Aisne department in France's Hauts-de-France region
- James Cohan Gallery an art gallery in New York City
- Cahan (disambiguation)
