= Cohen (given name) =

- Pronunciation: /ˈkoʊən/ KOH-en
- Gender: Male
- Language: English

Origin
- Language: Hebrew
- Meaning: Priest

Cohen is a masculine given name of Hebrew origin. It derives from the surname of the same spelling, meaning "priest." Cohen is a title associated with hereditary priests, most of whom descended from Aaron, the brother of Moses.

== Usage and popularity ==
The name first appeared on the SSA's list of the 1,000 most popular boys' names in 2004, at number 652. The name was given to 315 baby boys that year. It has since risen gradually in popularity; it ranked number 239 in 2024, with 1,475 baby boys given this name.

== Notable people ==
- Cohen Bramall (born 1996), English professional footballer
- Cohen Griffith (born 1962), Guyanese athlete
- Cohen Jasper (born 2000), South African rugby union player
- Cohen Kiewit, rugby player
