= The Price of Silence (book) =

2014 book by William D. Cohan

The Price of Silence: The Duke Lacrosse Scandal, the Power of the Elite, and the Corruption of Our Great Universities
- Cover, first edition
- Author: William D. Cohan
- Language: English
- Subject: Criminal investigation
- Genre: Non-fiction
- Publisher: Scribner
- Publication date: April 8, 2014
- Publication place: United States
- Media type: Print (hardback)
- Pages: 673 pp.
- ISBN: 978-1451681796
- Preceded by: Money and Power

The Price of Silence: The Duke Lacrosse Scandal, the Power of the Elite, and the Corruption of Our Great Universities is a book about the Duke lacrosse case by William D. Cohan. It was published on April 8, 2014, by Scribner.

== Summary ==
The Price of Silence is a new account of the 2006 Duke lacrosse case scandal that details the pressures faced by America's elite colleges and universities and addresses the issues of sexual misconduct, underage drinking, and bad-boy behavior.

The 2006 Duke lacrosse case was front-page news nationwide. Cohan feels that the true story of the alleged team rape case has never been told in its entirety and was more complex than all the reportage would indicate. The Price of Silence elaborated on what happened when the most combustible forces in American culture—unbridled ambition, intellectual elitism, athletic prowess, aggressive sexual behavior, racial bias, and absolute prosecutorial authority collided and then exploded on a powerful university campus, in the justice system, and in the media.

== Reviews ==
There have been positive reviews of the book, as well as mixed reviews, and negative reviews.

== Controversy ==
Cohan has also been criticized for not providing endnotes of definitively sourced material, or a list of interview subjects.

Two other issues that were discussed in detail by people who had a negative view of the book were Cohan's giving Mike Nifong long stretches to present rambling, factually-bereft defenses of his conduct and revisionist views of the case, and the fact that numerous allegations by Cohan were A) not supported with any hard facts and B) refuted by principals in the case who publicly stated that Cohan never spoke them and had fabricated his stories. In the most visible example of this, Cohan stated in his book that Governor Roy Cooper had acted against the wishes of North Carolina investigators when he dropped all charges against the Duke lacrosse players, but the investigators stated that Cooper's decision was completely correct and that Cohan's views were fiction.

== Publication history ==
- 2014, United States, Scribner, ISBN 978-1451681796, Pub date: April 2014, Hardback

== Explanation of the book's title ==
The "price" in the book's title refers to the alleged $60 million that Duke University paid to the three accused lacrosse players ($20 million each) with confidential terms and apparent silence provisions. The sum of money has been disputed to be actually about ⅓ that total ($18 million).

Cohan has said several times in public interviews: "That's a lot of money for a party. They bought a lot of silence with that 100 million dollars."
