= Kagan =

Kagan may refer to:

- Kagan (surname), including a list of people with the name
- Kagan, Uzbekistan, a town
- Kaghan Valley in Pakistan

== See also ==
- Cagn or Kaggen, supreme god of the San people (Bushmen) of Southern Africa
- Khagan or qaghan, a title for a ruler in Turkic and Mongolian languages
- Kağan (disambiguation)
- Kaghan (disambiguation)
- Kogen (disambiguation)
- Qaghan (disambiguation)
