= The Last Tycoons =

Non-fiction work by William D. Cohan

The Last Tycoons: The Secret History of Lazard Frères & Co.
- Hardcover edition
- Author: William D. Cohan
- Language: English
- Subject: Corporate History, Finance, Investment banking
- Publisher: Doubleday
- Publication date: April 3, 2007
- Publication place: United States
- Media type: Print (hardback)
- Pages: 752 pp.
- ISBN: 0385514514
- Followed by: House of Cards

The Last Tycoons: The Secret History of Lazard Frères & Co. is the debut book by William D. Cohan. It was released on April 3, 2007 by Doubleday. It focuses on the history of the prominent investment bank Lazard Frères. The book won the 2007 Financial Times and Goldman Sachs Business Book of the Year Award.

== Author ==
William D. Cohan, as of 2013 an author of three New York Times best-selling books about Wall Street, is a contributing editor at Vanity Fair, and a former award-winning investigative newspaper reporter based in Raleigh, North Carolina. He worked on Wall Street for seventeen years. He spent six years at Lazard Frères in New York, then Merrill Lynch, and later became a managing director at JP Morgan Chase.

== Chapters ==
1. Great Men
2. Tomorrow, the Lazard House Will Go Down
3. Original Sin
4. You Are Dealing with Greed and Power
5. Felix the Fixer
6. The Savior of New York
7. The Sun King
8. Felix for President
9. The Cancer is Greed
10. The Vicar
11. The Boy Wonder
12. The Franchise
13. Felix Loses It
14. It's a White Man's World
15. The Heir Apparent
16. All the Responsibility but None of the Authority
17. He Lit up a Humongous Cigar and Puffed it in our Faces for Half an Hour
18. Lazard May Go Down Like the Titanic
19. Bid-'em-up Bruce
20. Civil War
21. The End of a Dynasty

== Review ==
Richard Parker reviewed The Last Tycoons for The New York Times with a mixed assessment, stating the book told an interesting story but at some 700 pages was perhaps overlong:

...Cohan’s portrayal of the firm’s dominant partners — whose gargantuan appetites and mercurial habits provide the unifying force behind the book’s operatic melodramas — makes this an epic in its own way. In fact, “The Last Tycoons” bears a striking resemblance to F. Scott Fitzgerald’s The Last Tycoon. Fitzgerald set his novel in Hollywood, and described lives, temperaments and ambitions that closely approximate those of Lazard’s most important figures.

== See also ==
- Blue Blood and Mutiny, a book about another prominent investment bank, Morgan Stanley.
- The Great Game: The Emergence of Wall Street as a World Power: 1653–2000
