= Kağan =

Kağan may refer to:

- Khagan, a Turkic title
- Kağan Söylemezgiller, Turkish footballer
