= Charlotte Kohn =

Austrian writer

Charlotte Kohn, also Charlotte Kohn-Ley (born 1948 in Vienna) is an Austrian painter and journalist specializing in the Holocaust and history of antisemitism since 1945.

== Art ==
After completing her training in architectural design at the Higher Institute for Fashion and Clothing Technology in Vienna, Charlotte Kohn began to paint. She was particularly interested in the depiction of the human body. She began exhibiting as a freelance artist in 1975. She wrote in a 1996 text that painting was an existential necessity for her: "Perhaps it is presumptuous, but I have succumbed to the idea that I have to paint as many people as I possibly can in order to outweigh the senseless killing. I am addicted to multiplying life. I want my work to counterbalance the murder and the many deaths in my family".

== Writing ==
Since 1984 she has published essays in anthologies and has also worked as an editor.

From 1994 to 1996 she worked as the director of the Jewish Institute for Adult Education in Vienna. She organized interdisciplinary lecture series on aspects and manifestations of antisemitism, to which she invited well-known academics such as Susanne Heine, Julius H. Schoeps and writers such as Andrzej Szczypiorski, and published the contributions in anthologies.

The series of events Science in the Third Reich – The Discourse on the Jewish Body, which Charlotte Kohn conceived with Kirstin Breitenfellner at the Jewish Institute for Adult Education, resulted in the 1996 volume Wie ein Monster entsteht. On the construction of the other in racism and anti-Semitism.

For her 2006 book Luftfrauen. The Myth of a Jewish Women's Identity, which she illustrated herself, she interviewed 18 women. In the juxtaposition of "the generation of women born before the Holocaust with those born after", she asked about the significance of the shoah in their lives.

== Reception ==
Kohn was one of the first publicists in the German-speaking discourse to deal with antisemitic and anti-Judaic argumentation patterns in feminist publications at the end of the 1980s. In them, the "clichés of Judaism as the epitome of patriarchal religion and culture" were updated. Her volume Der feministische "Sündenfall"?, published with Ilse Korotin, is based on lectures held at the Jewish Institute for Adult Education in 1993. In it, Kohn criticized the involvement of parts of the Western European women's movement in anti-Semitism, projected onto the state of Israel, which made it impossible for Jewish feminists "to join feminist groups in Germany and Austria without self-denial". Her contribution was received in the contexts of feminist research and anti-Semitism after 1945. The volume was "the first feminist book on the anti-Judaism debate in Austria", according to Marie-Theres Wacker in her review in the journal L'Homme.
