= Money and Power =

Book by William D. Cohan

Money and Power: How Goldman Sachs Came to Rule the World
- Hardcover
- Author: William D. Cohan
- Language: English
- Subject: Corporate History, Finance, Financial crises, Investment banking
- Publisher: Doubleday
- Publication date: March 29, 2011
- Publication place: United States
- Media type: Print (hardback)
- ISBN: 978-0-385-52384-4
- Preceded by: House of Cards
- Followed by: The Price of Silence

Money and Power: How Goldman Sachs Came to Rule the World is the third book written by William D. Cohan. It chronicles the history of Goldman Sachs, from its founding to the subprime mortgage crisis of 2008. First published as hardcover on March 29, 2011, the book has been reprinted soon thereafter on April 12, 2011, by Doubleday again. The text has been reprinted as paperback on January 10, 2012, by Penguin Books.

== Book's Content ==
A longer excerpt of Money and Power is provided by Random House.

== Reviews ==
Reviews on William D. Cohan's Money and Power have appeared in Businessweek, The Economist, Financial Times, The Guardian, Mail on Sunday, New York Times Book Review and others.
