= Susin =

Goddess of Goguryeo

- Goddess of Cave or Grain
- Member of Goguryeo pantheon
- Hangul: 수신
- Venerated in: Goguryeo
- Major cult center: Gukdong Cave
- Abode: Cave
- Gender: Female
- Ethnic group: Goguryeo peoples
- Festivals: Dongmaengje
- Parents: Habaek?

Equivalents
- Gojoseon: Ungnyeo?

Susin (Korean: 수신; Hanja: 禭神; 隧神) is a goddess of Goguryeo. Along with Godeungsin (고등신; 高登神) and Yeongseongsin (영성신; 靈星神; lit. 'Star spirit deity'), she was one of the principal deities in the Goguryeo pantheon.

== Name and Identity ==
Susin is interpreted as either a cave deity or a grain deity. While she is generally regarded as the same figure as Lady Yuhwa, the mother of Dongmyeong, there is also a view that identifies this deity with Ungnyeo, the mother of Dangun.

== Worship ==
Susin was believed to reside in Gukdong Daehyeol (국동대혈; 國東大穴; lit. 'A large cave east of the capital'), a cave located east of the capital; in 1983, a site presumed to be the remains of a cave dwelling was discovered on a mountainside near Gungnae. According to the Book of the Later Han, Goguryeo held a ritual in honor of Susin every year in October:

In Goguryeo, people enjoyed performing rituals to Gwisin, Sajik, and Yeongseong. In October, they gathered in large numbers to perform a ritual dedicated to the heavens, which was called Dongmaeng. There was a large cave in the eastern part of the country called Susin, and they held a ritual there in October to honor it.

— Accounts of the Eastern Barbarians, Book of the Later Han.

According to the New Book of Tang, Susin was one of the principal deities of the 7th-century Goguryeo pantheon:

Their customs were rife with licentious worship. They worship Yeongseongsin, Ilsin, Kahansin, and Kijasin. There is a large cave to the east of the capital called Susin. Every year in October, the king personally performs a ritual there.

— Accounts of the Eastern Barbarians, New Book of Tang.

== See also ==
- Lady Yuhwa
- Ungnyeo
