= Kahansin =

Goguryeo deity

- Member of Goguryeo pantheon
- Other names

Korean name
- Hangul: 가한신
- Hanja: 可汗神
- RR: Gahansin
- MR: Kahansin
- Venerated in: Goguryeo
- Ethnic group: Goguryeo peoples

Equivalents
- Gojoseon?: Dangun?

Kahansin (Korean: 가한신; Hanja: 可汗神; lit. 'Khagan god?') is a deity of Goguryeo. Along with Yeongseongsin (영성신; 靈星神; lit. 'Star spirit deity'), Ilsin (일신; 日神; lit. 'Solar deity'), Susin (수신; 隧神; lit. 'Cave goddess'), and Kijasin (기자신; 箕子神; lit. 'God Jizi'), It was one of the major deities in the 7th-century Goguryeo pantheon. According to the Book of Tang:

Their customs were rife with licentious worship. They worship Yeongseongsin, Ilshin, Kahansin, and Kijasin. There is a large cave to the east of the capital called Susin. Every year in October, the king personally performs a ritual there.
其俗多淫祀. 事靈星神·日神·可汗神·箕子神. 國城東有大穴, 名隧神, 皆以十月, 王自祭之.

— Accounts of the Eastern Barbarians, Book of Tang

Since the term “Kahansin” uses the same Chinese characters as “Kehán” (可汗), the Chinese transliteration of the Mongolian and Turkic imperial title “Khagan,” some scholars view Kahansin as the deified form of the Khagan. In this case, it is believed that they worshipped the Kahansin in order to strengthen relations with the Göktürks and Khitans, who were nomadic tribes in the north bordering Goguryeo at the time. Other scholars suggest that the Kahansin refers to Dangun of Gojoseon or the founding deity of Goguryeo.

== See also ==
- Khagan
