= Gertrud Cohn =

Holocaust victim (1876–1942)

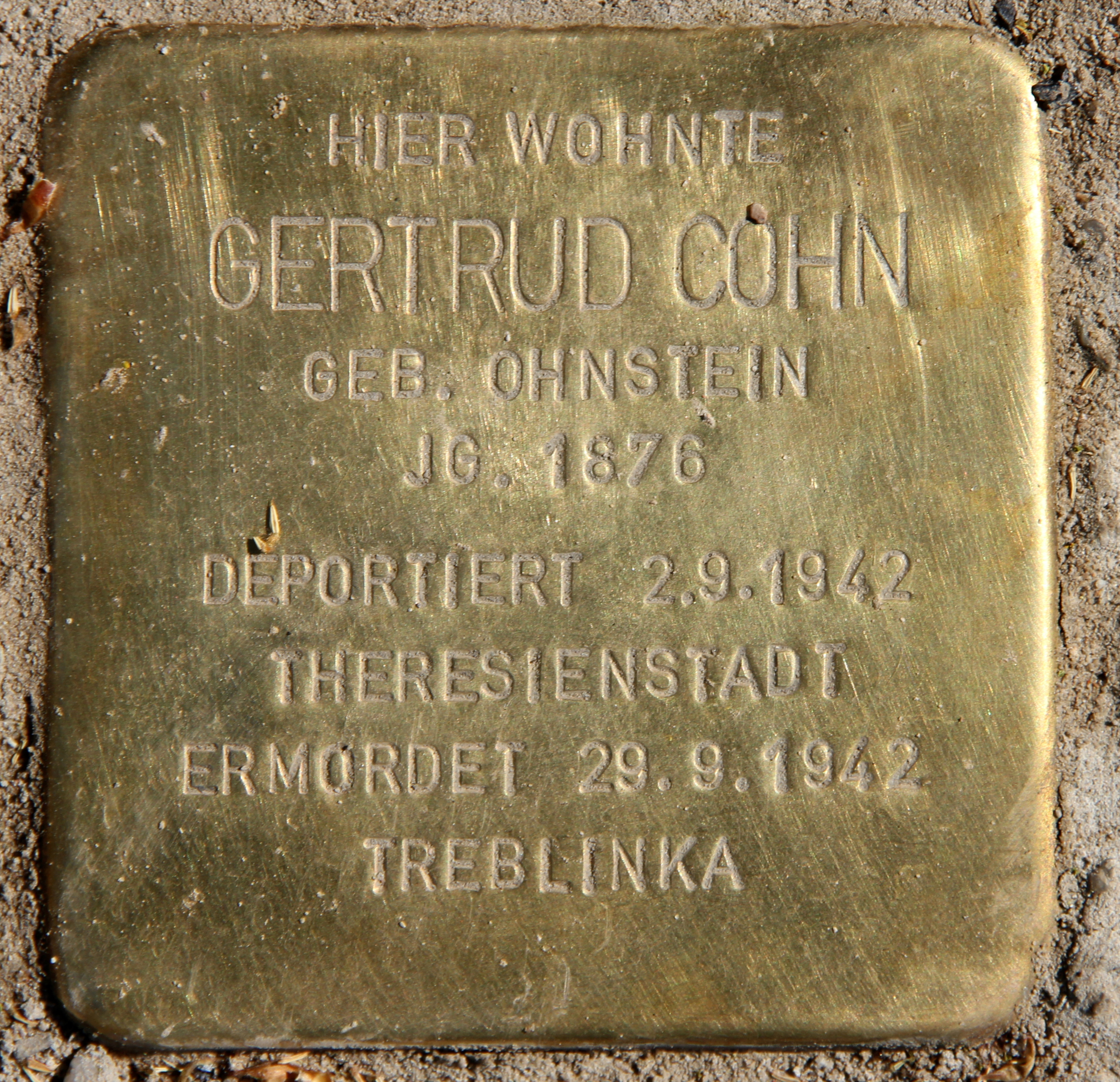
Stolperstein: “Here lived Gertrud Cohn. née Ohnstein 1870. deported 2.9.1942 Theresienstadt. murdered 29.9.1942” Treblinka

Gertrud Cohn (née Ohnstein; January 21, 1876 – September 29, 1942) was a German victim of the Nazi regime. The fate of her family was published as a children's book. The book became the basis for an exhibition, a play and a film. The book is used in German primary schools for children between ten and twelve.

== Personal life ==
Gertrud Cohn was the daughter of the businessman Isidor Ohnstein and his wife Natalie. She attended the Viktoria school in Berlin-Schöneberg. On July 1, 1900, Gertrud Ohnstein married the businessman Hugo Cohn. The couple had two sons: Ludwig, born on April 27, 1901, and Werner, who has been younger. Hugo Cohn died in 1928. His widow lived in good circumstances at Nikolsburger Platz 4, Berlin-Wilmersdorf.

Because of her Jewish origins, Gertrud Cohn was expelled from her apartment by the Nazis in 1940 and had to move into a “Judenhaus” (or Ghettohaus, ghetto house). On August 30, 1942, she was transported to the former Jewish retirement home at Grosse Hamburger Strasse 26 and deported via Anhalter Bahnhof to the ghetto of Theresienstadt, on September 2. She had to finance her accommodation in the ghetto with a “home purchase contract”. On September 29, 1942, Gertrud Cohn was transported to the extermination camp Treblinka and murdered there.

Her granddaughter Susi Collm, born in 1936, survived the Holocaust separated from her parents in various hiding places. Ludwig Cohn had changed his name to Collm. After the end of the war he was able to work as a grammar school teacher again and moved with his family into an apartment owned by the Cecilien school at Nikolsburger Platz 5. Susi Collm later emigrated to the United States.

== Reception ==
Today, there is a playground at Nikolsburger Platz 4. On April 29, 2012, the artist Gunter Demnig laid eleven “Stolpersteine” (stumbling blocks) there, donated by pupils, parents and teachers from the Cecilien school. With a scenic performance, the students commemorated the murder of the former residents and the expulsion of Jewish pupils from their school.

Birgitta Behr, a primary school teacher and artist, wrote and illustrated the children's book Susi. Die Enkelin von Haus Nummer 4 und die Zeit der versteckten Judensterne (Susi. The granddaughter of house no. 4 and the time of the hidden yellow badges). The graphic novel was published in 2016. The presentation in the school combined a radio play, stage and film performance. The following year, “Susi” was exhibited as a contribution by the school to the youth forum Jugendforum denk!mal '17 with 49 other projects in the Abgeordnetenhaus of Berlin.

From January 19 to June 16, 2019, the Museum Charlottenburg-Wilmersdorf showed the larger exhibition Susi. Die Enkelin von Haus Nummer 4, in Villa Oppenheim. Initiated and designed by Birgitta Behr it was curated like a “walk-in comic”. The program included a wide range of educational opportunities for school classes as well as teacher's handouts, worksheets and other materials. The exhibition “comiXconnection” in the Museum Europäischer Kulturen (Berlin, 2019) had the book and illustrations on display as an example of the mediating function of graphic novels.

.

== The book ==
Birgitta Behr, Sandra Wendeborn: Susi. Die Enkelin von Haus Nummer 4 und die Zeit der versteckten Judensterne. ArsEdition, Munich 2016. 109 pages. ISBN 978-3-8458-1525-1.
