= Kohan Chenar =

Kohan Chenar کهن چنار
- Village
- Location within Iran
- Coordinates: 29°52′26″N 55°44′15″E
- Country: Iran
- Province: Kerman
- County: Sirjan
- Bakhsh: Pariz
- Rural District: Pariz

Population (2006)
  - Total: 178
- Time zone: UTC+3:30 (IRST)
  - Summer (DST): UTC+4:30 (IRDT)

Kohan Chenar (Persian: کهن چنار, also Romanized as Kohan Chenār and Kahn Chenār) is a village in Pariz Rural District, Pariz District, Sirjan County, Kerman Province, Iran. At the 2006 census, its population was 178, in 40 families.
