= Lhen Coan =

Lhen Coan is the only natural canyon on the Isle of Man situated in Groudle Glen on the outskirts of Onchan. It is also the name of the nearby station on the Groudle Glen Railway. In the Victorian era the canyon was accessed by rustic timber walkways, which have been removed but the canyon is clearly discernible from the main path, and is crossed by a footbridge at the approach to the railway's main station.

Lhen Coan is Manx for "lonely valley".
