= Pir Kohan =

Pir Kohan پيركهن
- Village
- Location within Iran
- Coordinates: 28°02′29″N 59°15′20″E
- Country: Iran
- Province: Kerman
- County: Rigan
- Bakhsh: Central
- Rural District: Gavkan

Population (2006)
  - Total: 86
- Time zone: UTC+3:30 (IRST)
  - Summer (DST): UTC+4:30 (IRDT)

Pir Kohan (Persian: پيركهن, also Romanized as Pīr Kohan) is a village in Gavkan Rural District, in the Central District of Rigan County, Kerman Province, Iran. At the 2006 census, its population was 86, in 15 families.
