= Rob-e Kohan =

Rob-e Kohan ربع كهن
- Village
- Location within Iran
- Coordinates: 31°21′00″N 56°30′00″E
- Country: Iran
- Province: Kerman
- County: Ravar
- Bakhsh: Central
- Rural District: Ravar

Population (2006)
  - Total: 17
- Time zone: UTC+3:30 (IRST)
  - Summer (DST): UTC+4:30 (IRDT)

Rob-e Kohan (Persian: ربع كهن, also Romanized as Rob‘-e Kohan) is a village in Ravar Rural District, in the Central District of Ravar County, Kerman Province, Iran. At the 2006 census, its population was 17, in 4 families.
