= Kaghani goat =

Pakistani breed of goat

The Kaghani goat breed originates from Kaghan Valley in the Hazara region of Pakistan. It is also referred to as Bakerwali goat in some regions. Alongwith the meat obtained from the goat, it is known for its wool, used in the production of cashmere fiber.

The population of the goat also occurs in the neighbouring regions of Kaghan Valley; in Abbottabad, Mansehra, Swat, and Kohistan.

== See also ==
- Cashmere goat
