= Jonathan C. Kagan =

American immunologist and academic

Jonathan C. Kagan is an American immunologist and the Marian R. Neutra, Ph.D. Professor of Pediatrics at Harvard Medical School. He is also the director of Basic Research and Shwachman Chair in Gastroenterology at Boston Children's Hospital. Kagan is an authority on defining the molecular basis of innate immunity and inflammation.

== Early life and education ==
Kagan was born and raised in Farmingville on Long Island, New York, USA. He attended Sachem High School, where he was a wrestler. Kagan attended Bucknell University, where he wrestled for a nationally ranked Division I wrestling program and performed research in the laboratory of Dr. David Pearson. He received his Bachelor of Science degree from Bucknell and earned his Ph.D. in Microbial Pathogenesis from Yale University under Dr. Craig Roy. He then performed postdoctoral training with Ruslan Medzhitov at the Yale University School of Medicine.

== Research ==
Kagan runs a research lab at Harvard Medical School and Boston Children's Hospital. His lab's primary interest is to understand the molecular and cellular basis of inflammation and protective immunity. He has researched inflammatory pathways stimulated by Toll-like Receptors, cGAS-STING, RIG-I like Receptors and inflammasomes. Kagan's studies have led to a map of the subcellular sites of innate immune signal transduction, which describes the initial triggers of infection-induced immunity.

=== Studies of bacterial pathogenesis ===
During his Ph.D. studies with Craig Roy, a protégé of Lasker Awardee Stanley Falkow, Kagan studied how virulent bacteria multiply within macrophages. Through his studies of Legionella pneumophila, the cause of a potentially lethal pneumonia, he discovered that Legionella uses a Type IV secretion system to intercept vesicular traffic from endoplasmic reticulum (ER) exit sites. He identified the GTPases ARF1 and Rab1 as the host factors that mediate ER association with Legionella phagosomes and that these proteins are required for bacterial intracellular replication. Subsequent to this work, several additional pathogens were found to manipulate similar membrane trafficking pathways to establish a replicative niche. Kagan's research focus shifted during his postdoctoral studies to questions of how immune cells detect infection, which was an area pioneered by Charles Janeway Jr and Ruslan Medzhitov.

=== Mapping the subcellular sites of innate immune signal transduction ===
Kagan is recognized for pioneering the cell biological analysis of innate immunity, which revealed a map of the subcellular sites of innate immune signal transduction. His work identified subdomains of the plasma membrane that permit Toll-like Receptor 4 (TLR4) signaling and identified endosomes as a key site from which TLR4 signaling occurs. These discoveries led to the identification of a novel means by which TLR4 is transported between the cell surface and endosomes via CD14 and MD-2, and in the process revealed endocytosis as a TLR4-independent cellular response to bacterial lipopolysaccharides (LPS). Subsequent studies by Vishva Dixit and Edward Miao demonstrated additional TLR4-independent cellular responses to LPS. Kagan's work with the fruit fly Drosophila melanogaster provided the first in vivo evidence for the importance of protein localization for the antibacterial functions of the Toll pathway.

Kagan's lab identified peroxisomes and confirmed mitochondria as organelles that initiate signaling by the RIG-I like Receptors (RLRs). These organelles were found to induce distinct classes of interferon (IFN) genes, with Type III IFNs being selectively induced from peroxisomes and Type I IFNs from mitochondria. Kagan's studies of the cGAS-STING pathway revealed mutant cGAS proteins that signal from within mitochondria to induce Type I IFNs, and the role of mitochondrial reactive oxygen species in potentiating inflammasome-mediated pyroptosis through oxidation of the pore forming protein gasdermin D.

Kagan's work with Dr. Randi Rotjan explored the limits of innate immune pattern recognition. They discovered that human and mouse cells were unable to detect bacteria from ecosystems that are not inhabited by mammals. Specifically, the LPS receptors CD14, MD-2, TLR4, caspase-4 and caspase-11 were unable to detect LPS from >80% of bacteria harvested from the deep central Pacific Ocean. These findings established that LPS receptors preferentially detect bacteria from sympatric habitats—suggesting that innate immunity is defined locally, not globally.

=== Use of synthetic biology and the biochemical dissection of innate immunity ===
Kagan's lab characterized the endogenous myddosome, a receptor-proximal signaling complex used by most TLRs to stimulate inflammation. The myddosome was proposed to exist from analysis of recombinant death domains derived from the protein MyD88 and the IRAK family kinases in vitro, but whether this complex existed within cells was unclear. Kagan's studies demonstrated that the myddosome is not present in resting cells but is assembled rapidly upon microbial detection by multiple TLRs. The phosphoinositide-binding protein TIRAP was identified as a sensor of active TLRs on the plasma membrane and endosomes, which directs myddosome signaling from each organelle. Distinct components of the myddosome were found to activate NF-κB or glycolysis, a finding that established the myddosome as a signaling platform with modular effector functions.

Several other innate immune receptors induce the assembly of large protein complexes that are analogous to the myddosome. Included in this list are the inflammasome and MAVS complexes, discovered by Jürg Tschopp and Zhijian "James" Chen, both of which are assembled during infections. These receptor-proximal complexes are collectively known as supramolecular organizing centers (SMOCs), which are considered the signaling organelles of the innate immune system.

Kagan's lab has used synthetic biology to engineer the TLR-myddosome to induce necroptosis (rather than transcription) and the NLR-inflammasome pathways to induce IFN responses instead of pyroptosis. Kagan's lab further used synthetic biology to redesign human caspase-4 into an interleukin-1β (IL-1β) converting enzyme, which links LPS detection to IL-1β cleavage and release, independent of inflammasomes. The amenability of SMOCs to synthetic engineering provided experimental evidence that distinct signaling pathways operate by common design principles, which likely explains their prevalence in nature.

=== Defining mechanisms of interleukin-1 secretion and antiviral functions ===
Kagan's cell biological analysis of the inflammasome pathways revealed that NLRP3 inflammasomes can induce IL-1β release from living macrophages and dendritic cells. This idea ran counter to dogma, as it was widely considered that IL-1β was only released from these cells post-lysis. The mechanism of IL-1 secretion was revealed by Kagan, along with independent work by Petr Broz. Upon inflammasome activation, the protein gasdermin D (GSDMD) forms pores in the plasma membrane. Kagan and Broz independently found that GSDMD pores serve as membrane channels to permit IL-1β transit from the cytosol to the extracellular space. This mechanism is now recognized as the primary mediator of rapid IL-1β release post-inflammasome stimulation. Kagan also identified reactive oxygen species, controlled by the Ragulator-Rag-mTORC1 pathway, as regulators of GSDMD, with oxidation of a specific cysteine within GSDMD promoting its oligomerization into a membrane pore. This work was performed in macrophages.

Kagan's studies in human skin revealed that IL-1 induces an interferon (IFN)-like cellular state that protects cells from viral infection. The mechanisms of IL-1 release from skin cells differed from those induced in macrophages, in that they were not mediated by inflammasomes. Rather, virus inhibition of protein synthesis is sensed as a virulence strategy by the host, leading to gasdermin E (GSDME)-dependent pyroptosis and release of IL-1α. The BCL-2 family members MCL-1 and BCL-xL were identified as the pyroptosis-inducing guards of the translation machinery.

=== Investigations and theories on the evolution of innate immunity ===
Kagan's research on the evolution of innate immunity revealed that homologous innate immune signaling pathways operate via distinct mechanisms across animal species. His research revealed that, unlike humans and mice, numerous carnivoran species (cat, polar bear, panda, harbor seal, tiger and cheetah) encode caspases that detect bacterial LPS and cleave IL-1β. This ability to bind LPS and cleave IL-1β enabled cat macrophages to bypass the need for inflammasomes to link LPS detection to IL-1β secretion. In contrast, inflammasomes are key to link LPS detection to IL-1β secretion in humans and mice.

Similar species-specific themes emerged from Kagan's research on the DNA-activated cGAS-STING pathway that promotes Type I IFN responses to infection and cancer. Through the study of cGAS homologues within primates, Kagan found diversity in their ability to discriminate between self and exogenous (i.e. microbial) DNA. Human, marmoset and orangutan cGAS proteins contain an N-terminal domain that prevents self-DNA reactivity, whereas the analogous domain in mouse cGAS promotes self-DNA reactivity. Other primate cGAS proteins (e.g. chimpanzee and rhesus macaque) displayed no self-DNA reactivity. Self-DNA reactive cGAS proteins from humans and mice localized differentially to mitochondria or the cytosol-nucleus, suggesting that even when comparing self-DNA reactive cGAS proteins, distinct underlying mechanisms exist. This unexpected diversity in the functions of homologous proteins may impact pre-clinical pipelines for therapeutics that target the innate immune system.

Kagan has theorized that the mistakes that pathogens make during infections represent the primary drivers of innate immunity. This theory predicts that low-fidelity virulence strategies (known as infection infidelities) result in non-productive but immunostimulatory infections. In contrast, successful pathogens are able to avoid innate immune detection. Consequently, non-productive infections—which are rarely the focus of scientific and clinical investigations—may represent key immunostimulatory activities that drive host defense. This topic was the highlight of a podcast on microbe.tv.

=== Discovery of hyperactive dendritic cells and applications to cancer immunotherapies ===
Kagan's discovery of IL-1β release from living cells led to the identification of a novel state of dendritic cell activation—hyperactivation. Hyperactive dendritic cells display activities similar to classically activated dendritic cells (e.g. expression of cytokines and costimulatory molecules, and MHC-mediated antigen presentation). Additionally, hyperactive dendritic cells uniquely gain the ability to provide T cells with IL-1β over the course of several days and display a strong capacity for lymph node migration. Consequently, hyperactive dendritic cells were identified as potent inducers of long-lived memory T cells that eradicate tumors that were otherwise resistant to PD-1 based checkpoint blockade.

In 2020, Kagan co-founded a Boston-based biotech company Corner Therapeutics, with colleagues Jeff Karp, Andrew Bellinger and Steve Altschuler. The company is developing novel DC hyperactivators and other immunotherapies, based in part on Kagan's research, to treat cancers and infectious diseases.

Kagan's scientific bibliography can be found here.

== Teaching and scientific communication ==
At Harvard, Kagan created the first course dedicated to the study of innate immunity and co-created a long-running course on Mechanisms of Bacterial Pathogenesis and the Host Immune Response. He is an author of reviews and perspectives on the molecular mechanisms and evolutionary implications of immunity and has an active science-based social media presence.

== Honors and recognition ==
As a Ph.D. student, Kagan was the first scientist to receive the Prize Teaching Fellowship, which is among the most important honors that Yale bestows upon graduate students. These awards are conferred jointly by the Dean of the Graduate School and the Dean of Yale College.

His research has been recognized with the Investigator Award from the American Association of Immunologists, the Burroughs Wellcome Fund Investigators in the Pathogenesis of Infectious Disease Award, the Alois Nowotny Award from the International Endotoxin and Innate Immunity Society and the MERIT award from the National Institute of Allergy and Infectious Diseases (NIAID). Kagan is a recipient of the Brina Sheeman Shackelford BBS Teaching Award from Harvard Medical School.

Kagan is an elected Fellow of the American Academy of Microbiology.

== Personal life ==
Kagan resides in the Boston community with his wife and three children.
