= Milton Kohn =

American Holocaust memorabilia collector (1912-2001)

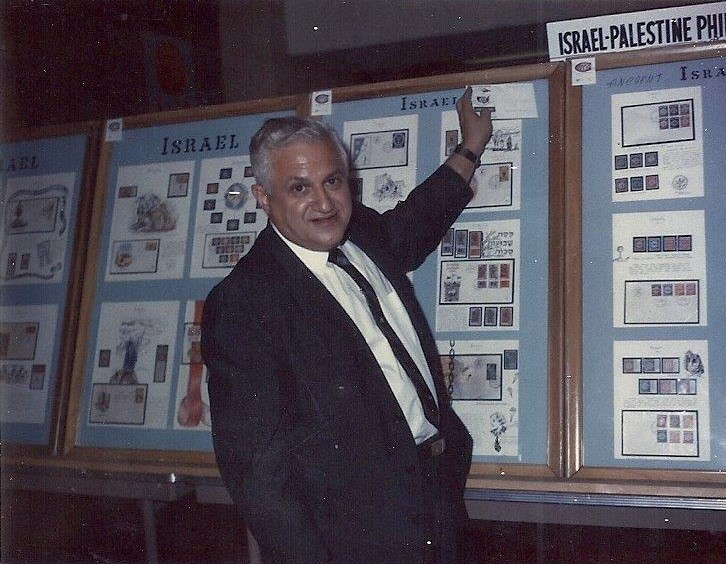
- Milton Kohn Displaying Holocaust Collection
- Born: September 2, 1912; Chicago, Illinois, U.S.
- Died: August 12, 2001 (aged 88); Chicago
- Known for: Holocaust collection

Milton Mendel Kohn (September 2, 1912 – August 12, 2001) was an American architect who was one of the leading private collectors of Holocaust memorabilia. He at one point had the world's largest collection of Holocaust memorabilia. His collection is now on display at the Florida Holocaust Museum in St. Petersburg, Florida.

== Background ==
Kohn was born in Chicago to Siegfried and Tillie Kohn, German-speaking Jewish emigrants from Czechoslovakia. He had studied architecture at the Armour Institute of Technology, which is now known at the Illinois Institute of Technology. He was an architect who designed the Community Center building for the South Side Hebrew Congregation at the corner of 73rd and Chappel on the south side of Chicago. He also worked at the American Ideal Cleaning Co., his family's cleaning business.

In 1965, Kohn had developed a nervous tick and when his doctor told him to find a hobby to alleviate his stress, he began collecting stamps. However, Kohn's interest in Holocaust memorabilia grew when he saw that his uncle Adolph's name was on a partial list of victims cremated at Theresienstadt concentration camp on July 5, 1943.

Kohn's wife Janet died in 1988. They had two sons, Kerry and Lester, and a daughter, Judith.

== Collection ==
Kohn's collection had hundreds of items, but largely letters. It included a Torah made into a banjo, a collection of tattooed human skin, and a bar of soap rendered from human fat. Kohn made the cases by hand including the inscriptions.

His collection was shown locally in synagogues as well as internationally, and he gave many interviews about both his collection and the Holocaust. The collection was shown in China, South Africa, Israel and in 12 European countries as well as throughout the United States.

Kohn’s collection is now part of the Florida Holocaust Museum, with some pieces shown in the museum and some part of their traveling exhibits. The Janet Kohn Gallery on the second floor is named after Kohn’s wife, Janet.
