= William D. Cohan =

American business writer

William David Cohan
- Born: February 20, 1960 (age 66); Worcester, Massachusetts
- Education: Phillips Academy; Duke University; Columbia School of Journalism; Columbia University Graduate School of Business
- Occupations: financial journalist Previously: mergers and acquisitions banker
- Notable work: The Price of Silence (2014); Money and Power (2011); House of Cards (2009); The Last Tycoons (2007)
- Spouse: Deborah Gail Futter (m. 1991)
- Relatives: Peter Cohan, brother
- Awards: 2007 Financial Times and Goldman Sachs Business Book of the Year Award for The Last Tycoons
- Website: WilliamCohan.com

William David Cohan (born 1960) is an American business writer.

== Early life and education ==
Cohan was born in Worcester, Massachusetts on February 20, 1960. His father was an accountant and his mother worked in administration. Cohan is a graduate of Duke University, Columbia University School of Journalism, and Columbia University Graduate School of Business.

== Career ==
Cohan was an investigative reporter for the Raleigh Times. He then worked on Wall Street for seventeen years as a mergers and acquisitions banker. He spent six years at Lazard Frères in New York, then Merrill Lynch, and later became a managing director at JP Morgan Chase. He also worked for two years at GE Capital. Since 2013, he has been a trustee of the National Humanities Center in Research Triangle Park, NC.

His books include Money and Power: How Goldman Sachs Came to Rule the World, House of Cards: A Tale of Hubris and Wretched Excess on Wall Street, Why Wall Street Matters, Power Failure: The Rise and Fall of an American Icon, and The Last Tycoons: The Secret History of Lazard Frères & Co., for which he won the 2007 FT/Goldman Sachs Business Book of the Year Award.

== Controversy ==
=== Price of Silence ===
Cohan authored "The Price of Silence: The Duke Lacrosse Scandal, the Power of the Elite, and the Corruption of Our Great Universities" about the Duke lacrosse rape hoax. It has been criticized for false claims, no new evidence, overreliance on disbarred and disgraced DA, Mike Nifong, and fringe theories. Cohan, after speaking with Crystal Mangum stated, "that I am convinced something happened." In 2024, Mangum finally confessed to fabricating the rape, and falsely accusing the players. Cohan has not printed any correction or publicly acknowledged Mangum's statement.

=== Trump Vanity Fair Article ===
In 2019, Cohan alleged the possibility that US president Donald Trump or someone close to him had used advance knowledge of political developments to profit from insider trading, publicized in two articles for Vanity Fair titled "'Who Knew Trump Would Offer a Truce With Xi?': The Mystery of the Wall Street Trump Trades" and "'There Is Definite Hanky-Panky Going On': The Fantastically Profitable Mystery of the Trump Chaos Trades". Cohan's second article caused congressional representatives Ted Lieu and Kathleen Rice to call for a federal investigation, but several experts interviewed by Bloomberg News questioned the evidence, while Cohan stood by the article but distanced himself from the implied conclusion ("I don’t make any allegations, I don’t know what really happened"). Writing in Slate, Felix Salmon called Cohan's articles "bullshit", arguing that he had no evidence that the trades in question were unusual, or that they had yielded the alleged profits, or that insider knowledge had been involved at all. Further, Terry Duffy, the CEO of CME Group, the company that operates the exchange where the futures are traded, questioned Cohan's understanding of the data: “[Cohan] mistakenly summed up all volume for those derivatives during spans of time and implausibly attributed that buying and selling, spread across thousands of transactions, to a single bad actor or group of cheaters."

== Personal life ==
In 1991, Cohan married editor Deborah Gail Futter in a Jewish ceremony.

== Books ==
- The Last Tycoons: The Secret History of Lazard Frères & Co. (2007). Winner, Financial Times and Goldman Sachs Business Book of the Year Award.
- House of Cards: A Tale of Hubris and Wretched Excess on Wall Street (2009). The last days of Bear Stearns & Co. In a talk about the book at Cal State Long Beach, Cohan said he felt it was his mission to get a response to questions left unanswered by Wall Street CEOs.
- Money and Power: How Goldman Sachs Came to Rule the World (2011). Examines the historical role and influence of Goldman Sachs.
- The Price of Silence: The Duke Lacrosse Scandal, the Power of the Elite, and the Corruption of Our Great Universities (2014). The story of the Duke lacrosse case.
- Why Wall Street Matters (2017).
- Four Friends: Promising Lives Cut Short (2019). Portraits of Cohan's boarding school roommates at Andover: John F. Kennedy Jr., Jack Berman, Will Daniel, and Harry Bull.
- Power Failure: The Rise and Fall of an American Icon (2022). 798 pp. About the General Electric Company.
- Money to Burn: The Unvarnished Truth about Leon Black, Apollo, and the Rise of a New Wall Street (2026).
