= Stephen M. Coan =

Non-Profit Leader

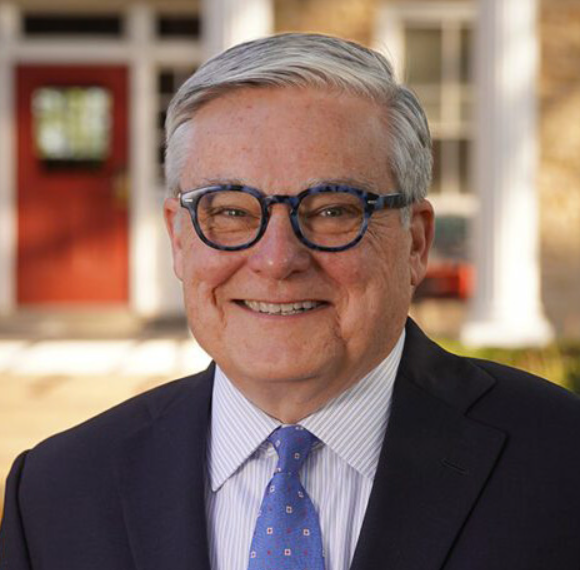
Dr. Stephen M. Coan

Stephen M. Coan, Ph.D., is a leader and executive in the youth mentorship, education, environmental, and non-profit sectors. In December 2025 Dr. Coan was appointed as the president and chief executive officer of the National Police Athletic/Activities League, which promotes the prevention of juvenile crime and violence by building relationships among kids, cops, and communities through positive engagement.

As president and CEO, Dr. Coan leads all aspects of National PAL's operation, including strategic planning, program development, finances, membership, fundraising, relationships with local chapters, external partnerships, and marketing. National PAL provides services and support to more than 300 local Police Athletic/Activities League chapters that offer a growing range of academic, athletic, enrichment, and career exploration programs to more than two million youth nationwide.

Dr. Coan's appointment comes as the organization is expanding its offerings for youth, including an initiative that promotes resiliency and personal growth; a partnership with NFL FLAG, the National Football League's flag football program; and two additional corporate partnerships aimed at providing children with hands-on STEAM learning experiences expected to be announced in the near future.

Upon his appointment as National PAL's president and CEO, he said, "I am grateful for the opportunity to collaborate with our hundreds of chapters nationwide and law enforcement leaders throughout the nation to grow the PAL mission. Our mission has never been more important in preventing youth crime and violence, protecting youth from the increasing threat of cyberspace crimes, and increasing respect for law enforcement. I have always had deep respect and appreciation for the work of thousands of officers and PAL staff who work tirelessly, every day, to improve the lives of some of the most vulnerable youth in our nation."

Prior to his most recent appointment by the National PAL Board of Directors, Dr. Coan served as the organization's executive director and chief operating officer.

Dr. Coan previously led several non-profit and youth serving organizations as CEO, focusing on several important common denominators: mentoring, building bridges between the law enforcement community and children, developing academic pathways for at-risk youth, career awareness, STEAM (Science, Technology, Engineering, Arts and Mathematics) skills, environmental stewardship, and workforce development.

Among Dr. Coan's previous leadership roles were executive-level positions with Ripon College in Ripon, Wisconsin; the Sea Research Foundation, which operates Mystic Aquarium in Mystic, Conn.; and JASON Learning, a non-profit provider of STEM (Science, Technology, Engineering, and Mathematics) curricula for K-12 students and teachers. He also has served as a college professor, youth counselor, and college admissions officer, and has served on numerous boards, commissions, and advisory councils in his areas of expertise.

== Education ==
Dr. Coan was born in Boston. He earned Bachelor of Arts degrees in history and philosophy from Brandeis University, a master's degree in Management of Human Services from Brandeis' Heller School for Social Policy and Management, and a Doctor of Philosophy degree in Youth Development and Education Partnerships, also from the Heller School. His doctoral dissertation examined the impact of public-private partnerships in improving educational outcomes during the desegregation of the Boston Public Schools.

== Career ==
Dr. Coan began his career as a college admissions officer, later worked for several years as a youth outreach counselor in the Appalachia region of eastern Kentucky and with the Boston Archdiocese, and then ran a youth mentoring organization in Waltham, Mass. He has held faculty appointments at Tufts University, Bentley University and Cambridge College.

From 1993 to 2002, Dr. Coan served as chief education officer for JASON Learning, an innovative non-profit provider of STEM curricula for K-12 schools and after-school educational organizations, including those in communities with at-risk populations. He led the development and implementation of, and secured funding for, the widely acclaimed international program, which utilized distance learning technologies to allow for accomplished STEM professionals to mentor students. The program, which partnered with the National Geographic Society, NASA, the National Science Foundation, and other major non-profit and corporate organizations, pioneered use of the Internet and digital technologies in the classroom and has reached millions of students and teachers through online curricula, print curricula, after-school programs, and live broadcasts and webcasts.

In 2001, Dr. Coan joined the Sea Research Foundation in Mystic, Conn., which operates Mystic Aquarium, one of the nation's leading marine mammal research centers with a focus on conservation, education and research and annual host to some 800,000 annual visitors and tens of thousands of students. Dr. Coan was named executive vice president and chief operating officer in 2004, and, in 2006, became the foundation's president and CEO, a position he held through 2022. Under Dr. Coan's leadership, the Mystic Aquarium engaged low-income communities with programs specifically designed to be affordable and accessible, and supported STEM programs for at-risk youth, efforts that were recognized with the Institute of Museum and Library Services' National Medal. The award was presented to Dr. Coan at the White House by First Lady Michelle Obama in 2014.

Under Dr. Coan's stewardship, Mystic Aquarium's campus and visitor experiences were transformed through construction of the Immersion Building, Wiederhold Animal Care Building, and the Milne Ocean Science and Conservation Center, infrastructure improvements to the facilities, and installation of several new exhibits including new galleries and touch tanks in the main aquarium building.

Dr. Coan led the effort that secured accreditation of the aquarium by the Association of Zoos and Aquariums, the highest possible recognition that a living animal institution can achieve. He additionally led the aquarium through numerous crises including the aftermath of the 9/11 attacks, when tourism came to a halt, the recession of the mid-2000s, and COVID-19. He implemented a financial restructuring that stabilized the institution's finances post-pandemic. He increased attendance and programming, raised more than $250 million, and made the aquarium one of the largest providers of conservation and STEM education programming in New England and a major marine mammal research facility.

In 2010, during his tenure as president of the aquarium, Dr. Coan was named president and chief executive officer of JASON Learning, the STEM education non-profit he had previously served as chief education officer. He held that position through 2015, simultaneous with his presidency of the aquarium, in a unique partnership to transform JASON Learning from a first-generation STEM initiative with legacy technology to a sustainable education system utilizing NextGen, standards-based teaching and learning experiences.

Dr. Coan's leadership was marked by his staunch advocacy of ocean conservation and protection of marine life. In 2021 he attended a proclamation signing ceremony at the White House with President Joe Biden to celebrate the federal action to restore protections to the Northeast Canyons and Seamounts Marine National Monument, the only marine monument in the US Atlantic Ocean. He also advocated consistently for the role of aquariums in promoting education about science and environmental subjects.

In August 2022, Dr. Coan retired from the Sea Research Foundation. In a statement, Connecticut Governor Ned Lamont lauded Dr. Coan for building the Mystic Aquarium into one of the state's most important cultural institutions.

Dr. Coan in 2023 joined Ripon College, a private, four-year liberal arts institution in Ripon, Wisconsin, as vice president of finance. There, he developed a financial plan focusing on sustainability and growth while supporting student recruitment and retention goals. He worked to raise awareness of financial challenges faced by small liberal arts colleges.

A longtime supporter of law enforcement, Dr. Coan joined National PAL in 2024 as executive director and chief operating officer. Working with National PAL's board and staff, he immediately launched efforts to solidify its organizational structure, increase programming for and support of local chapters, raise public awareness of its mission and activities, and establish new corporate partnerships, including with NFL FLAG, RCX Sports, and the team management application Spond.

== Boards and Commissions ==
Dr. Coan has served on numerous boards, commissions, and councils relevant to his areas of expertise. He serves on the New England Commission of Higher Education, the nation's oldest body for accrediting colleges and universities, and on the board of the Cal Ripken Sr. Foundation. He is a past member of the Stonington, Conn., Police Commission, a former chairman of the Chamber of Commerce of Eastern Connecticut, was an inaugural member of the North American Marine Environment Protection Association and provided strategic assistance to the National Marine Sanctuary Foundation. In 2021, Governor Lamont appointed Dr. Coan as chairman of the Connecticut Tourism Advisory Council. Dr. Coan additionally served on the Board of Directors of Catholic Charities of the Diocese of Norwalk, Connecticut Commission on Tourism, the Governor's Transition Committee on Energy and Environment, and on the boards of Horizons in Windham, Conn. and the Pine Point School in Stonington, Conn.

== Honors and awards ==
In addition to representing Mystic Aquarium to receive the Institute of Museum and Library Services' National Medal at the White House in 2014, Dr. Coan has been honored by various organizations throughout his career. In 2014 he received the Chamber of Commerce of Eastern Connecticut's William Crawford Distinguished Service Award. That same year, he received Urban Tech's Educational Leadership Award. Dr. Coan received the 2019 Family Champion Award from The Connecticut Council of Family Service Agencies, Inc., for his outstanding volunteer service to children and families.
