= Pavel Kogan =

Pavel Kogan is the name of:

- Pavel Kogan (poet) (1918–1942), Soviet poet
- Pavel Kogan (conductor) (born 1952), Russian violinist and conductor
