= Lesley Kagen =

American novelist

- Born: Milwaukee, Wisconsin, U.S.
- Education: University of Wisconsin–Madison
- Occupation: Novelist
- Website: lesleykagen.com

Lesley Kagen is an American novelist from Milwaukee. Her first book, Whistling in the Dark, 2007, which takes place in a Milwaukee neighborhood, made The New York Times Best Seller list. Her novels are written from the viewpoints of children or young narrators, capturing the "kids' honesty, their unique way of viewing the world, their direct way of talking, [and] their enthusiasm." Common themes in her stories, which are set in the 1950s and 1960s, include: dealing with loss, family, mystery, discovering the truth, inner-workings of a community, sibling bonds, childlike perception, innocence and corruption.

== Biography ==
Lesley Kagen grew up in Milwaukee and attended the University of Wisconsin–Madison, where she majored in Radio and Television. She worked as a morning drive DJ on an alternative radio station before moving to Los Angeles where she worked at Licorice Pizza record chain, writing, producing, and voicing commercials. Kagen's career as an actor involved on-air commercials, made-for-TV movies, and an episode of Laverne and Shirley.

After meeting her husband and having two kids, Kagen and family moved back to Milwaukee where she became the co-owner of a popular Japanese sushi restaurant, Restaurant Hama, which closed for business in 2009.

At age 57, Kagen began her career as a novelist. Her first novel, Whistling in the Dark, published in May 2007 is a "coming-of-age thriller set in Milwaukee during the summer of 1959." Publishers Weekly deemed the "mystery elements" of the novel as "sketchy" but said that "Kagen sharply depicts the vulnerability of children of any era." In an interview discussing Whistling in the Dark, Kagen said, "Some of this book is very autobiographical. My father did die when I was very young and my mother did get very sick during one summer, and my sisters and I were left with our stepfather who we really didn't know. That trauma and that sense of fear and insecurity that I felt as I child, I think I transferred to Sally," the protagonist of the novel.

Publishers Weekly described Kagen's second novel, Land of a Hundred Wonders, 2008, as a "winsome" story that "offers laughter and bittersweet sighs." The story's protagonist is a young girl, Gibby McGraw, who survived a car accident in which her parents died and which resulted in brain damage making her "Not Quite Right." As a young adult and struggling newspaper reporter in a small town, Gibby gets involved in the solving of a murder as an attempt to prove to everyone that she is "Quite Right."

Kagen's next novel, Tomorrow River, 2010, was reviewed as "stellar" and "spellbinding" by Publishers Weekly. The novel tells the story of Shenandoah Carmody who struggles to take care of her twin sister after the disappearance of their mother.

Her fourth novel, Good Graces, published in 2011, is a sequel to the New York Times Best Seller Whistling in the Dark. It was reviewed to be a "spot-on sequel" and claimed "reader's who enjoyed the first book are in for a treat."

== As an author ==
Kagen draws upon her experiences in her writing. She has said, "some writers can set their work in a place without having to experience it, but it's very important to me to feel grounded in a story. To have tasted the food, to become part of the culture and know the language of a certain place if I'm going to make it feel authentic."

She writes from children's perspectives because, according to her, "it feels natural for me to write in a kid's voice. Maybe it is because I'm getting older and coming full circle, I don't know. Childhood seems close to me now." In her novels, Kagen explores themes of loss and heartbreak, while mixing in hope and humor because, she says, "all of us deal with loss in one way or another in our lives. We lose our loved ones, our jobs, our health. Humor and hope for a better day are the only things I know that transcend pain".

== Influences ==
As a child, Nancy Drew and Carolyn Keene were big influences in Kagen's life. Favorite books of hers are To Kill a Mockingbird by Harper Lee and A Three Dog Life by Abigail Thomas.

== Selected works ==
- Whistling in the Dark (2007)
- Land of a Hundred Wonders (2008)
- Tomorrow River (2010)
- Good Graces (2011)
- Mare's Nest (2012)
- The Resurrection of Tess Blessing (2014)
- The Mutual Admiration Society (2017)
