= Kohon =

Kohon or Cohon may refer to:

- David José Kohon
- George Cohon (born 1937), Canadian businessman
- Mark Cohon (born 1966), Canadian Football League's 12th Commissioner
- Jared Cohon (born 1947), eighth President of Carnegie Mellon University

== See also ==
- Cohen (disambiguation)
- Cohons, a commune in the Haute-Marne department in northeastern France
- Cajón, a box-shaped percussion instrument
