= McKagan =

McKagan is a surname. Notable people with the surname include:

- Duff McKagan (Michael Andrew McKagan, born 1964), American rock musician, brother of Matthew
- Matthew McKagan (born 1961), American music educator, brother of Duff
- Sam McKagan, American physics educator
- Susan Holmes McKagan (born 1972), American model and fashion designer
