= Komarovsky =

Komarovsky (Russian: Комаровский; masculine), Komarovskaya (Комаровская; feminine), or Komarovskoye (Комаровское; neuter) is the name of several rural localities in Russia:

- Komarovsky, Krasnoyarsk Krai, a settlement in Mokrushinsky Selsoviet of Kansky District of Krasnoyarsk Krai
- Komarovsky, Orenburg Oblast, a settlement in Orenburg Oblast under the administrative jurisdiction of the closed administrative-territorial formation of the same name
- Komarovskaya, a village in Verkhnetoyemsky Selsoviet of Verkhnetoyemsky District of Arkhangelsk Oblast

Komarovsky is also the family name of the following people:

- Anatoly Komarovsky, Russian violinist, conductor, and composer
- Erez Komarovsky, Israeli chef and author
- Mirra Komarovsky, American sociologist
- Yevgeny Komarovsky, Ukrainian pediatrician
- Yury Komarovsky, Russian politician
