= Leonie Cohn =

British radio producer

Leonie Clara Cohn (1917-2009, married name Findlay) was a BBC radio producer

== Early life and education ==
Cohn was born on 22 June 1917 in Königsberg to a Jewish family. In 1935, she moved to Italy to study at the University of Rome. Both of her parents were murdered in the Holocaust. After finishing school, she moved to the United Kingdom to live with the art critic Herbert Read and his family.

== Career ==
During the Second World War, she worked as a translator for the BBC's German Service. She married Paul Findla, who eventually became the head of BBC TV administration, and had two children, Mark and Andrea.

She retired in 1977 after 36 years with BBC. She died on 9 August 2009 at age 92 and was buried with her husband on the eastern side of Highgate Cemetery.

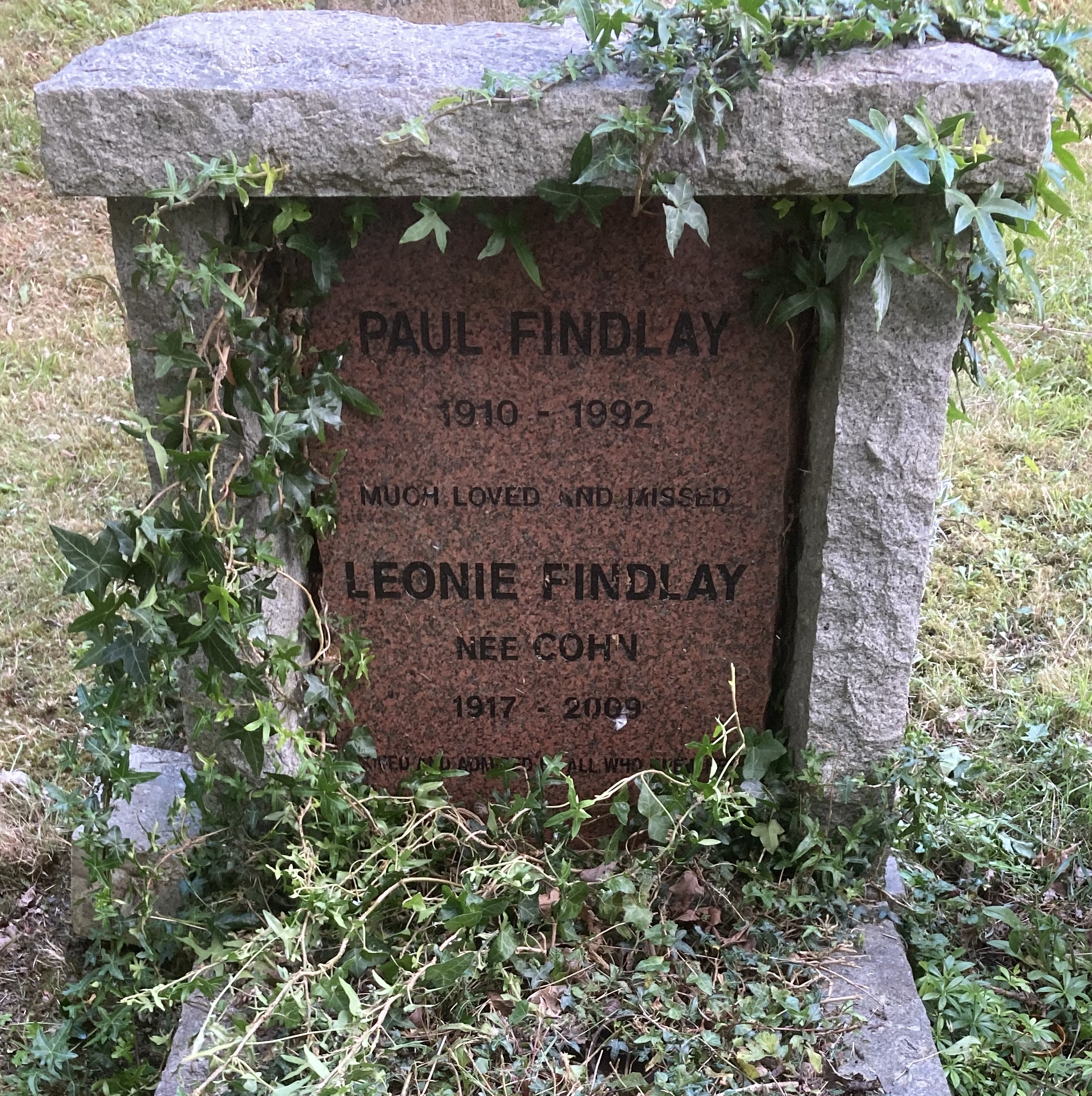
Grave of Leonie Cohn in Highgate Cemetery

== Selected publications ==
- Cohn, Leonie; Shire, Adrian, eds. (2000). Belsize 2000: A Living Suburb. Belsize Conservation Area Advisory Committee. ISBN 978-0953942107.
- Cohn, Leonie, ed. (1986). Belsize Park: A Living Suburb. Belsize Park Conservation Area.
