= Bernhard Kagan =

German chess player and writer (1866–1932)

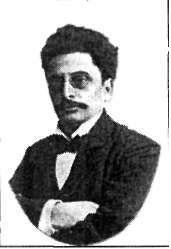
Bernhard Kagan.

Bernhard Kagan (15 August 1866, Grodno – 27 November 1932, Berlin) was a German chess player, writer, publisher, editor, and organizer.

== Biography ==
Born in the Polish part of Russia, Kagan lived in Berlin, where he played in local tournaments. He took 7th in 1898, tied for 7–9th in 1902, took 6th in 1903, shared 2nd in 1923, and tied for 7–10th in 1925. He also shared 4th at Hanover 1902, tied for 6–7th at Ostend 1907, and took 10th at Prague 1908.

He organised several chess contests in Berlin at the end of World War I. Four grandmasters (Emanuel Lasker, Akiba Rubinstein, Carl Schlechter and Siegbert Tarrasch) participated in the strongest event. It took place in the Kerkau-Palace from 28 September until 11 October 1918.

Kagan was an author of series of chess monographs (among others on prodigy Samuel Reshevsky, Samuel Rzeschewski das Schachwunderkind, Berlin 1920). He published Kagans Schachkatalog from 1917 to 1927, and was an editor of the quarterly (later monthly) magazine Kagans Neueste Schachnachrichten (Kagan's latest chess news) from 1921 to 1932. Many of the great tournaments of the period appeared in supplements to the magazine.

== Literature ==
- Friedmann R., Schachmeister Kagan zum 60 Geburtstage (1926)
- Kagan M., Bernhard Kagan. Sein Lebensbild (Berlin 1933)
