= Kohan-e Pancharak =

Kohan-e Pancharak كهن پنچرك
- Village
- Location within Iran
- Coordinates: 28°15′35″N 57°29′32″E
- Country: Iran
- Province: Kerman
- County: Anbarabad
- Bakhsh: Esmaili
- Rural District: Esmaili

Population (2006)
  - Total: 88
- Time zone: UTC+3:30 (IRST)
  - Summer (DST): UTC+4:30 (IRDT)

Kohan-e Pancharak (Persian: كهن پنچرك; also known as 'Kohan) is a village in Esmaili Rural District, Esmaili District, Anbarabad County, Kerman Province, Iran. At the 2006 census, its population was 88, in 26 families.
