= Scott I Kahan =

American physician and writer

Scott I. Kahan is an American physician, writer, and internationally recognized expert on obesity prevention and treatment. He is the director of the Strategies To Overcome and Prevent (STOP) Obesity Alliance, a nonprofit coalition of more than 70 consumer, provider, government, labor, business, health insurers and quality-of-care organizations and the director of the National Center for Weight and Wellness. His clinical practice and research addresses obesity prevention and treatment, chronic disease risk reduction, health behavior change in populations, and clinical aspects of weight management. His public policy work focuses on expanding access to care for obesity treatment services, addressing weight stigma, and training physicians in obesity treatment modalities.

== Personal background ==
Kahan was born in 1975 in New York City. His completed a B.S. in bioengineering at Columbia University and received his medical degree from the Medical College of Pennsylvania, now Drexel University College of Medicine. He completed a residency at Johns Hopkins University, where he served as chief resident. He received his Masters of Public Health degree from Johns Hopkins Bloomberg School of Public Health.

== Career ==
Kahan is the director of the George Washington University-based Strategies to Overcome and Prevent (STOP) Obesity Alliance, a nonprofit coalition of more than 70 consumer, provider, government, labor, business, health insurers and quality-of-care organizations whose purpose is to advance the public conversation about obesity and develop practical strategies to combat obesity and weight bias. He founded and directs the National Center for Weight and Wellness in Washington, D.C., which provides clinical treatment of obesity and weight-related health issues.

Kahan is board-certified in preventive medicine and obesity medicine. He is also board certified as a Physician Nutrition Specialist. He is one of only seven physicians worldwide who is board-certified in both obesity medicine and nutrition. He holds a faculty appointment at the Johns Hopkins Bloomberg School of Public Health, where he has served as associate director of the Johns Hopkins University Weight Management Center and as a member of the core faculty of the Preventive Medicine Residency Program. He also holds a faculty appointment at the George Washington University School of Public Health and Health Services, is a clinical professor at George Washington University School of Medicine, and previously served as co-director of the George Washington University Weight Management Center. Kahan is a Fellow of The Obesity Society and a diplomate of the American Board of Preventive Medicine.

He developed the first obesity training curriculum for physicians at George Washington University School of Medicine and the first undergraduate course on obesity at Johns Hopkins School of Arts & Sciences. He served as External Reviewer for the National Institutes of Health and is a member of the Editorial Board for the Obesity Education Network. He was nominated for the Robert Wood Johnson Foundation Young Leader Award in 2012.

Kahan has advised the White House, U.S. House of Representatives, numerous national and international organizations, and federal and state government agencies on issues related to obesity, weight management, nutrition, preventive medicine and public health. He has delivered numerous invited presentations at professional and public conferences and events, including TEDx Manhattan and TEDMED. He has been quoted in radio, television, newspaper and online news stories by media including CNN, C-SPAN, MSNBC, NPR, CBS Radio, Men's Health, Radio France, NBC, HITN, USA Today, Voice of Russia, U.S. News & World Report, Family Circle, the L.A. Times, the Atlanta Journal-Constitution, the Washington Post, Fox, PBS, AP, WebMD, and Time.

Kahan created the “Medicine In A Page” medical reference series, serving as editor-in-chief for the series and co-author of the individual volumes. He also writes a blog for The Huffington Post.

== Selected works ==
- Kahan S, Gielen AC, Fagan P, Green LW. Health Behavior Change in Populations. Johns Hopkins University

Press, 2013 (in press).

- Barnard N, Weissinger R, Jaster B, Kahan S, Smyth C. Nutrition Guide for Clinicians (2nd edition), 2009.
- Kahan S, Ashar B. Internal Medicine...In a Page (2nd edition). Lippincott, Williams & Wilkins, 2008.
- Kahan S, Miller R, Smith E. Signs & Symptoms…In a Page (2nd edition). Lippincott, Williams & Wilkins, 2008.
- Teitlebaum J, Kahan S, DeAntonis K. Pediatrics…In a Page (2nd edition). Lippincott, Williams & Wilkins, 2008.
- Kahan S, Williams R. Ambulatory Medicine…In a Page. Lippincott, Williams & Wilkins, 2008.
- Prasad R, Kahan S. Cardiology…In a Page. Lippincott, Williams & Wilkins, 2007.
- Perkins J, Kahan S, McCue J. Inpatient Medicine…In a Page. Lippincott, Williams & Wilkins, 2007.
- McCue J, Kahan S. Infectious Disease…In a Page. Lippincott, Williams & Wilkins, 2007.
- Brillman J, Kahan S. Neurology…In a Page. Blackwell Publishing, 2005.
- Carr P, Ricciotti H, Freund K, Kahan S. Obstetrics, Gynecology, & Women’s Health…In a Page. Blackwell

Publishing, 2004.

- Teitlebaum J, DeAntonis K, Kahan S. Pediatric Signs & Symptoms…In a Page. Blackwell Publishing, 2004.
- Kahan S, Raves J. Surgery…In a Page. Blackwell Publishing, 2004.
- Kahan S. Medicine…In a Page. Blackwell Publishing, 2003.
- Medical Ethics Confronts Obesity: Weight-Based Stigma and Physician Bias (American Medical Association Journal of Ethics, April 2010)
- Calories: What Counts (Baltimore Sun, March 3, 2010)
- The USDA's Unhealthful Budget (Baltimore Sun, May 1, 2007).
- Current Management of Obesity (Continuing Medical Education course)

== Selected articles ==
- Kahan S, Ferguson C, David S, Divine L. Obesity Drug Outcome Measures: Results of Multi-Stakeholder Critical Dialogue. Current Obesity Reports 2013;2.
- Cheskin LJ, Kahan S, Shantha GP. Intentional weight loss and dose reductions of antihypertensive medications: a retrospective cohort study. CardioRenal Medicine 2012 (submitted).
- Ferguson C, Kahan S, Tan E, Doer A. Obesity perceptions and training among primary care physicians. Health Affairs (submitted).
- Shantha GP, Kumar AA, Kahan S, Cheskin LJ. Association between glycosylated hemoglobin and intentional weight loss in overweight and obese patients with type 2 diabetes mellitus: a retrospective cohort study. Diabetes Educ. 2012;38(3):417-26.
- Kumar AA, Shantha GP, Kahan S, Samson RJ, Boddu ND, Cheskin LJ. Intentional weight loss and dose

reductions of anti-diabetic medications – a retrospective cohort study. PLoS One. 2012;7(2): e32395.

- Kahan S, Freedhoff Y. Interventions to reduce or modify dietary fat reduce cardiovascular events. Ann Intern

Med. 2012; 156(2): JC1-4, JC15.

- Cheskin LJ, Margolick J, Kahan S, Mitola AH, Poddar KH, Nilles T, et al. Effect of nutritional supplements onimmune function and body weight in malnourished adults. Nutr Metab Insts. 2010;3:25-35.
- Cheskin LJ, Kahan S, Geller G. Weight-based stigma and physician bias. AMA Journal of Ethics. April

2010;12(4):258-262. Commentary
