= Maud Coan Josaphare =

American writer and arts educator (1886–1935)

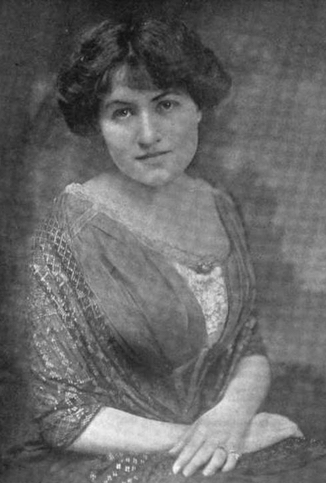
- Josaphare, from the cover of a 1912 publication
- Born: Maud Josephine Coan; March 18, 1886; Norristown, Pennsylvania, U.S.
- Died: June 1935 (aged 49); Chicago, Illinois, U.S.
- Other names: Maud Coan Josaphare; Josephine Josaphare; Coán Josaphare
- Education: University of Pennsylvania; Columbia University; Philadelphia Textile School; Pennsylvania Academy of the Fine Arts
- Spouse: Lionel Josaphare (m. 1904)
- Children: 1

Maud Josephine Coan Josaphare (March 18, 1886 — June 1935), credited variously as Maud Coan Josaphare, Josephine Josaphare, and Coán Josaphare, was an American writer and arts educator.

== Early life ==
Maud Josephine Coan was born in Norristown, Pennsylvania, the daughter of Joseph M. Coan and Helen Christina Blair Coan. She trained as a teacher at the School of Industrial Art in Philadelphia, with further studies at University of Pennsylvania, Columbia University, Philadelphia Textile School, and the Pennsylvania Academy of Fine Arts.

== Career ==
Maud Coan taught art, English, and other topics at a high school in San Francisco and in the public schools in Philadelphia and Puerto Rico. In 1906 she was elected a member of the Delaware County Institute of Science. She was listed on the staff of the School of Industrial Art from 1909 to 1911, teaching methods for public school art education. In 1920, she spoke at the Chicago chapter of the American Association of Teachers of Spanish and Portuguese, on the topic of Puerto Rico. In 1922 she was listed as a teacher of Spanish at Lake View High School in Chicago.

In 1913, she was hired by the Illinois State Vice Commission, because her brother M. Blair Coan was one of the commissioners, to judge whether the modern art in the Armory Show was too indecent to be displayed at the Art Institute of Chicago. She reported that "I found pictures at the exhibition which are simply lewd, and others that are lewd only to artists," proposing that some works are immoral because they encourage other artists to abandon "truthful" depiction as a goal.

Maud Coan Josaphare wrote articles on women in arts and crafts, including leatherwork, metalwork, pottery, needlework, batik, and photography. She was a member of The Plastic Club in Philadelphia. She had a book review program on Chicago radio in the months before her death in 1935.

== Personal life ==
Maud Coan married writer Lionel Josaphare on June 29, 1904, in Kings County, New York. Their daughter, Helen Blair Josaphare (Long), was born September 21, 1905, in Pennsylvania. Maud Coan Josaphare died in 1935, aged 49, in Chicago.
