= Yevgeni Koganov =

Russian footballer

Personal information
- Full name: Yevgeni Viktorovich Koganov
- Date of birth: 29 August 1976 (age 50)
- Height: 1.78 m (5 ft 10 in)
- Position: Defender

Senior career*
| Years | Team | Apps | (Gls) |
| 1992–1994 | PFC CSKA-d Moscow | 65 | (1) |
| 1995–1998 | FC Zenit Saint Petersburg | 5 | (0) |
| 1995–1996 | → FC Zenit-d Saint Petersburg | 21 | (2) |
| 1996 | → FC Arsenal Tula (loan) | 24 | (0) |
| 1997 | → FC Zenit-d Saint Petersburg | 28 | (1) |
| 1998 | FC Ladoga Kirovsk | | |
| 1999 | FC Oazis Yartsevo | 20 | (1) |
| 1999–2001 | FC Kristall Smolensk | 59 | (0) |
| 2002 | FC Terek Grozny | 33 | (0) |
| 2003 | FC Neftyanik Ufa | 19 | (0) |
| 2004 | FC Salyut-Energiya Belgorod | 3 | (0) |
| 2005–2008 | FC Kolomyagi-47 Saint Petersburg | | |
- * Club domestic league appearances and goals

Yevgeni Viktorovich Koganov (Russian: Евгений Викторович Коганов; born 29 August 1976) is a former Russian football player.

== Club career ==
He made his Russian Premier League debut for FC Zenit Saint Petersburg on 30 March 1996 in a game against FC Dynamo Moscow. That was his only season in the RPL.
