= Koan (disambiguation) =

A kōan is a type of text or utterance in Zen Buddhism.

Koan may also refer to:

== Japan ==
- Kōan (Kamakura period), a Japanese era (1278-1288)
- Kōan (Muromachi period), a Japanese era (1361-1362)
- Emperor Kōan, the 6th emperor of Japan
- Kōan (公安), an abbreviation for any of the following public security agencies:
  - Public Security Intelligence Agency
  - Public Security Examination Commission, part of the Ministry of Justice
  - National Public Safety Commission (Japan)

== Music ==
- Koan (program), an algorithmic music software package
- KOAN Sound, a glitch-hop duo
- Koan, an album by Stephan Micus
- Koan, a musical composition by James Tenney

== Radio and television stations ==
- KOAN-LP, a television station in Anchorage, Alaska
- KOAN (AM), a radio station in Anchorage, Alaska
- KVNT, a radio station (1020 AM) licensed to serve Eagle River, Alaska, which held the call sign KOAN from 2009 to 2013

== Other uses ==
- Hacker koan, a humorous anecdote written by hackers about computer science
- Koan or Coan, demonym of the island Kos
- Ministry of Public Security (China)
- White Koan, a modern sculpture at the University of Warwick
- Koan, a software program that works with Cobbler (software)
- Kōan, a member of the Black Moon Clan from Sailor Moon R
