= Maxwell Kogon =

Canadian recipient of the DFC

Maxwell Kogon DFC (1920–1980) was a Royal Canadian Air Force (RCAF) bomber pilot who was awarded the Distinguished Flying Cross during World War II.

== Family life ==
Flight Lieutenant Maxwell (Max) Kogon was born on October 1, 1920, to Edith and David Kogon as the youngest of eight children in Toronto, Ontario, Canada. He married Annette (Honey) Karry in 1948. He adopted Annette's daughter from her previous marriage, Nancy, and had one son, David. Maxwell Kogon died on October 31, 1980.

== RCAF Service ==
During World War II, Flight Lieutenant Max Kogon was a member of 428 (Ghost) Squadron. On the first of his 37 missions he was told to bomb Hanover. After he finished this, severe icing on his motors caused them to stop rotating. After crossing the English Coast, both of the engines of his Handley-Page Halifax failed and his airspeed indicator became unusable. He told his crew to bail out, but Maxwell stayed in the aircraft and successfully crash landed it without landing gear. Flight Lieutenant Kogon mainly flew a Halifax but later switched to an Avro Lancaster. He won a Distinguished Flying Cross from the RCAF on September 1, 1944. He was the only member of his squadron to not be killed or captured in 18 months. His most known target was the V-1 Base in Pennemunde. 1n 1945 he was discharged from the RCAF.

=== Postwar ===
After the war, KLM offered Kogon a job as the chief flying instructor, but Kogon declined. As a Jew, he was contacted by the Irgun to be a fighter pilot during the anticipated 1948 Arab–Israeli War but he said he preferred to wait for the Haganah to contact him because it was less intense. However, they never contacted him.
