= Cahan (surname) =

Cahan is an Irish and Jewish surname. Notable people with the surname include:

- Abraham Cahan (1860–1951), American writer and politician
- Charles Cahan (1861–1944), Canadian politician
- Larry Cahan (1933–1992), Canadian ice hockey player
