= Aleksandr Kogan =

Alexandr Kogan may refer to:

- Aleksandr Kogan (artist) (born 1980), Russian singer and artist
- Aleksandr Kogan (politician) (born 1969), Russian politician
- Aleksandr Kogan (scientist) (born 1986), data scientist involved in the Cambridge Analytica scandal
