= Kohan (surname) =

Kohan is a Slavic, Iranian, or Jewish surname. Notable people with the surname include:

- Buz Kohan (Alan Kohan, born 1933), American writer, producer, father of
  - David Kohan (born 1964), American television producer
  - Jenji Kohan (born 1969), American television writer, producer and director
- Martín Kohan (born 1967), Argentine author and essayist
- Amin Jahan Kohan, Iranian footballer
- Mohammad Mayeli Kohan (born 1953), Iranian football player
- Silvia Kohan (1948–2003), Argentine singer and songwriter
- Morgan Kohan (born 1993), Canadian actress

== See also ==
- Janet Kohan-Sedq (1945 - 1972), Iranian athlete
- Cohen (surname), another spelling
