= Kogon (surname) =

Kogon is a surname. Notable people with the surname include:

- Eugen Kogon (1903–1987), German politician, survivor of the Buchenwald concentration camp, and author of The Theory and Practice of Hell
- Julie Kogon (1918–1986), American boxer
- Maxwell Kogon (1920–1980), Canadian bomber pilot
