= Kokhanov =

Kokhanov (Russian: Коханов), female Kokhanova, is a Russian surname. Notable people with the surname include:

- Alexey Kokhanov (born 1981), singer, sound artist, and composer based in Moscow and Berlin
