= Kirstin Breitenfellner =

Austrian-German journalist

Kirstin Breitenfellner (born 26 September 1966 in Vienna) is an Austrian-German author, journalist, literary critic and yoga teacher.

Kirstin Breitenfellner grew up in Austria. After studying German literature, philosophy and Slavic studies at the University of Heidelberg and the University of Vienna, she worked as an editor and proofreader for magazines. In 1994, she began to publish poetry in magazines. Her first novel, Der Liebhaberreflex (The Lover Reflex) (2004) was invited to the European Festival. Subsequent novels include Falsche Fragen (2006) and Die Überwindung des Möglichen (2012). These books often deal with philosophical issues. Since 2012, she has also written children's books, and in addition to her writing career she has worked since 1993 as a yoga teacher.
