= Peter Cohan =

American businessman

Peter S. Cohan is an American businessman, author and teacher. He is the founding principal of Peter S. Cohan & Associates, a management consulting and venture capital firm. He has completed over 150 growth-strategy consulting projects for global technology companies and invested in seven startups—three of which were sold for over $2 billion and his most recent—Sofi Technologies—went public in July 2021 at an $18 billion valuation.

Cohan is an Associate Professor of Management Practice at Babson College. He teaches business strategy, entrepreneurship, leadership, and management consulting to both undergraduate and graduate students. RETHINK Retail selected him as a Top 100 Retail Influencer in 2021, 2022, 2023, 2024, and 2025 and a Top AI in Retail Influencer in 2014

== Journalism ==
Cohan writes the Start-up Economy column for Forbes.com where he is a senior contributor, and "The Hungry Start-up" column for Inc magazine, Wall and Main, his Worcester Telegram & Gazette column, helped its Business Matters section win the 2012 New England Newspaper and Press Association award for the best Business page for papers over 30k circulation]. He was a member of the Wharton Blog Network, which received the Gold Award in the 2013 Council for Advancement and Support of Education (CASE) District II Accolades Awards program.

== Personal life ==
From September 2004 to September 2008, Cohan served on the board of the Alzheimer's Association, Massachusetts Chapter. He is the brother of William D. Cohan.

== Books ==
- Brain Rush: How To Invest and Compete in the Real World of Generative AI (Apress: July 2024) (ISBN 979-8868803)
- Goliath Strikes Back: How Traditional Retailers Are Winning Back Customers from Ecommerce Startups (Apress: December 2020) (ISBN 978-1484265185)
- Scaling Your Startup: Mastering the Four Stages from Idea to $10 Billion (Apress: January 2019) (ASIN B07N3WQ1WL)
- Startup Cities: Why Only a Few Cities Dominate the Global Startup Scene and What the Rest Should Do About It (Apress, February 2018) ISBN 978-1484233924
- Disciplined Growth Strategies: Insights From the Growth Trajectories of Successful and Unsuccessful Companies (Apress, February 2017) ISBN 978-1-4842-2447-2
- Hungry Start-up Strategy: Creating New Ventures with Limited Resources and Unlimited Vision (BK Business, 2012), ISBN 978-1609945282
- Export Now: Five Keys to Entering New Markets (Wiley, 2011), co-authored with Frank Lavin, ISBN 978-0470828168
- Capital Rising (Palgrave-Macmillan, 2010), co-authored by U. Srinivasa Rangan, ISBN 978-0230612310
- You Can't Order Change (Portfolio, 2009), ISBN 978-1591842392
- Value Leadership (Jossey-Bass, 2003), ISBN 978-0787966041
- Net Profit: How to Invest and Compete in the Real World of Internet Business (Wiley, 2001), ISBN 978-0787944766
- E -Profits by Peter S Cohan - The 12 Steps To Creating A State Of The Art E-Commerce Strategy For Any Size Business, ISBN 978-1905953691
- The Technology Leaders: How America's Most Profitable High-Tech Companies Innovate Their Way to Success (Jossey-Bass, Publishers, 1997), ISBN 978-0787910723

He has also contributed to six compendiums of modern management.

== Business School Cases ==
With Babson professor Sam Hariharan, he has co-authored five business school cases, two of which are Harvard Business Publishing Best Sellers.

- Apple in China and India (Babson College: July 2020) (BAB492-PDF-ENG) Harvard Business Publishing Best Seller
- Apple's Electric Vehicle (Babson College: June 2023) (BAB741-PDF-ENG) Harvard Business Publishing Best Seller
- Growing Pains at Commonwealth Dairy (Babson College: July 2020) (BAB239-PDF-ENG)
- Reviving Edwards Lifesciences (Babson College: March 2022) (BAB160-PDF-ENG)
- Warren Buffett and his Newspaper Investments (Babson College: March 2014) (BAB155-PDF-ENG)
