= Falk Cohn =

German rabbi

Personal life
- Born: 18 September 1833 Dessau, Anhalt-Dessau, German Confederation
- Died: 6 March 1901 (aged 67) Bonn, German Empire
- Buried: Bonn Jewish Cemetery
- Spouse: Sidonie Herzberg (died 1897)
- Education: University of Leipzig

Religious life
- Religion: Judaism

Falk Cohn (Hebrew: פאלק כהן; 18 September 1833 – 6 March 1901) was a German rabbi.

== Biography ==
Falk Cohn was born in Dessau in 1833, the son of a rabbi and teacher at the city's Herzogliche Franzschule. He began the study of the Talmud in his early years. After completing his matriculation, he studied philology and philosophy in Berlin, where he also continued his Talmudic studies. On 23 February 1860 he received the degree of Ph.D. from the University of Leipzig, his thesis titled Philosophischkritische Abhandlung über den Schlußvers des Zweiten Buchs der Psalmen ('Philosophical-critical Treatise on the Concluding Verse of the Second Book of Psalms').

In May 1861 Cohn became a preacher in Köthen, Anhalt-Bernburg. After working from 1862 to 1867 as preacher and religious teacher in Waren, Mecklenburg, he went to Bielitz, Austrian Silesia, as director of the local Jewish communal school. Five years later he became preacher at Oels, holding the position until 1882. In that year he was appointed rabbi in Bonn, where he remained until his death.

Cohn contributed several essays to periodicals, and many of his sermons were printed. Among his significant works are Israelitischen Religionsschulen neben höheren Lehranstalten, Zur Frage über die Arbeitsüberbürdung der Schüler und Schülerinnen Höherer Lehranstalten, and Die Disciplin in den Jüdischen Religionsschulen.

== Selected publications ==
- Philosophischkritische Abhandlung über den Schlußvers des Zweiten Buchs der Psalmen (Thesis). University of Leipzig. 1860.
- Bedeutung und Zweck des Versöhnungstages. Predigt gehalten am Vorabende des Versöhnungsfestes 5622 in der Synagoge zu Cöthen. Leipzig: C. L. Fritzsche. 1862.
- Die Rückkehr. Predigt gehalten am Abende des Versöhnungsfestes 5623. Leipzig: C. L. Fritzsche. 1862.
- Glaube, Liebe und Vertrauen. Predigt gehalten bei der Gedächtnissfeier für Ihre k. Hoheit, der hochsel. Frau Grossherzogin Anna von Mecklenburg-Schwerin in der Synagoge zu Waren. Schwerin. 1865.
- Die Sprache eines Denkmals. Predigt zur Jahresfeier des Frankfurter Friedensschlusses. 1873.
- Israelitischen Religionsschulen neben höheren Lehranstalten. Breslau: A. Hepner. 1878.
- Prolog zum 50 jährigen Stiftungsfest der Chewra Kadischa in der Sprache eines Denkmals.
- "Die Entwickelung des jüd. Unterrichtswesens von Mendelssohn bis auf die Gegenwart. Ein Vortrag". Das jüdische Literaturblatt. Magdeburg. 1880. pp. 28–30.
- Zur Frage über die Arbeitsüberbürdung der Schüler und Schülerinnen Höherer Lehranstalten. 1881.
- Die Disciplin in den Jüdischen Religionsschulen. Oels. 1881.
- Gottes Stimme über den Wassern. Predigt am Sabbath Chanuka 5643 in der Synagoge zu Bonn. Bonn: E. Strauß. 1881.
- Drei Predigten, gehalten am Vorabende und an beiden Tagen des Neujahrsfestes 5648 in der Synagoge zu Bonn. Frankfurt: J. Kauffmann. 1887.
