= Elizabeth Ann Kahane =

American photographer (born 1961)

- Born: Elizabeth Ann Wright; 1961 (age 64–65); New York City, New York, U.S.
- Occupation: photographer
- Website: eakahane.com

Elizabeth Ann Kahane (née Wright; born 1961 in New York City) is an American photographer.

== Work ==
1995 Kahane's photos are capturing the Queer community's voguing moments, costuming and personal expression as they celebrated NYC's downtown annual “Wigstock” event. This series was resurrected from the archive in honor of the 50th Anniversary of Stonewall in 2019.

2010 I love a Parade. A collection of parade photographs from the 4th of July in Sun Valley to St. Patrick's Day in New York City, these photographs offer a viewpoint of parades from a first-person perspective.

2016 Preschool Portraits, AHRC New York City. Exhibition at Central Park West Gallery and AHRC Gala.

2017 Gallery Exhibition from a Private collection at the Jessica Hagen Gallery in Newport, Rhode Island.

2017 The Lotus Still Life series features pond flowers from Kahanes's Japanese garden. Set within an arts & crafts interior, the Japanese ceramic vases with silver inlay sit atop an antique American wicker table with a copper top. These photographs were included in the exhibition “Flower Power”, at Jessica Hagen Fine Art in the Summer of 2021. These floral images are used as the basis for decorative rugs produced in Brescia, Italy.

2018 A Lens on Israel, museum exhibition – Temple Emanu-El Bernard Museum, New York. Seven photographers traveled to Israel under the auspices of the American Jewish Joint Distribution Committee. They were afforded access to places that were not otherwise accessible to the public.

2019 Off the Wall! On Safari With E.A. Kahane. Exhibition at the Jessica Hagen Gallery, Newport.

2020 We Need a Parade! Exhibition at Historic Newport Spring Park, Newport, RI. E.A. Kahane was the mastermind behind an expansive free outdoor installation at the Historic Newport Town Spring in Newport, created in direct response to the COVID-19 pandemic.

2021 The Flag Project. Public Installation – Rockefeller Center, New York. An open call was held inviting photographers to submit images for consideration for The Flag Project. Kahanes's image: St. Patrick’s Day Parade, NYC, 2010 from the series I love a Parade was selected by Chris Boot, who was then executive director of the Aperture Foundation. The exhibition also featured such photographers as Renee Cox, Roe Ethridge, Nan Goldin, Ryan McGinley, and Tyler Mitchell. Each selected photograph was printed on an 8-foot by 5-foot flag and on view from March 27 to April 30, 2021.

2022 Front Row Seat, The Most Beautiful Race in the World. Exhibition at the Museo Mille Miglia in Brescia, Italy, a large-scale photographic installation in the courtyard of the museum, and at the Sarah Langley Gallery in Newport, RI.

2024 Come Join the Parade, 25 years from my third floor window. Gallery exhibition, book and film. For over 25 years, Kahane has photographed the Macy's Thanksgiving Day Parade from a third-floor apartment window on Central Park West at 64th Street. The photographs include clowns, Broadway performers, floats, marching bands, cheerleaders, spectators, and character balloons from TV and film. The project has also been featured in exhibitions at the Useppa Island Historical Society in 2026 and the Art Center Sarasota in Florida in 2024.

2025 Heart of the Race, Master Mechanics of the Mille Miglia Exhibition at the Museo Mille Miglia and at the Centro per le Nuove Culture, Brescia, Italy. A photographic series by Kahane that pays tribute to the often unseen master mechanics who make the historic Mille Miglia possible. Through a combination of portraits and documentary images captured during the race, the project shifts attention away from the celebrated cars to the people whose skill, endurance, and creativity keep them running.

== Philanthropic work ==
In addition to photography Elizabeth Kahane helps some of her favorite charities by donating her work for auction and sales. Those charities and organizations include:

- La Zebra Odv and 1000 Miglia, supporting the children's hospital of Brescia.
- Her Justice, providing pro bono legal support for women facing domestic violence.
- Hearts of Gold, supporting homeless mothers and their children.
- AHRC New York City, serving 15,000 children and adults with special needs in New York City and the boroughs.
- Newport Art Museum's Wet Paint Fundraiser.
- St. Bernard's School, New York City.

She is member of the following organizations: 2011—Present Associazione Caggianese D'America of New York and New Jersey, 2006—Present The Core Club, New York City, NY, and Milano, Italy, 1999—Present Women's Committee of the Central Park Conservancy, NYC, 1990—Present Young Men's and Women's Real Estate Association, New York City.

== Board positions ==
Aperture, New York, (2015—Present), Useppa Island Historical Society, Useppa Island, FL (2026—Present), Brooklyn Museum of Art, Brooklyn, (2019–2025), AHRC NYC Foundation (2010–2023), Newport Art Museum, Newport, (2014–2019). COMMITTEE POSITIONS

== Committee positions ==
Tate Britain, London, Photography Acquisitions Committee (2019—Present), Photofairs, New York, Advisory Board (2023), Guggenheim Museum, New York, Guggenheim Photo Council (2019–2022), International Center of Photography, New York, Collections Committee ICP (2015–2020).

== Publications ==
- Come Join the Parade! Designed by Yolanda Cuomo and printed by Graphicom in Verona, Italy 2024. ISBN 13979-8218460952.

== Films ==
- From my third Floor Window. Macy's Thanksgiving Day Parade was filmed from her third-floor apartment window on Central Park West.

== Awards ==
- As a longtime supporter of AHRC, New York City, and co-chair for their annual fundraiser, a trustee for over 10 years, Kahane is the first woman recipient of the Anthony M. Fisher Humanitarian Award.

== Personal life ==
Kahane married William Kahane in a Jewish ceremony on 20 June 1999.

== Museum exhibitions ==
- 2016 "Annual Members Juried Exhibitions". Newport Art Museum, Newport, RI, Group exhibition.
- 2018 "HOME: Lens on Israel". Temple Emanu-El Bernard Museum, NYC, Group Exhibition
- 2022 "FRONT ROW SEAT, The Most Beautiful Race in the World". Museo Mille Miglia, Brescia, Italy. Site Specific Outdoor Installation.
- 2025 "I LOVE A PARADE". New York Historical, solo exhibition.
- 2025 "HEART OF THE RACE: Master Mechanics of the Mille Miglia". Museo Mille Miglia and MoCa: Centro per le Nuove Culture, Brescia, Italy, solo exhibition.
- 2026 "COME JOIN THE PARADE!". Useppa Island Historical Museum, solo exhibition.

== Collections ==
- The Brooklyn Museum, Brooklyn, NY.
- The New York Historical, New York, NY.
- Newport Art Museum Newport, RI.
- Museo Mille Miglia Brescia, Italy.
- ADAC, Allgemeiner Deutscher Automobil-Club Munich, Germany.
- The Barack Obama Foundation Chicago, IL.
- Newport Historical Society Newport, RI.
- The American Jewish Joint Distribution Committee New York, NY.
- AHRC New York City, New York, NY.

== Bibliography ==
- Tanja Lynch: Meet Elizabeth Kahane. Newport neighbors, October 2020.
- Lilah Ramzi:Watching the Macy’s Thanksgiving Day Parade From Her Apartment Window for 25 Years, Vogue * Interview with Kahane November 27, 2024.
- Fiva (Fédération Internationale des Véhicules Anciens): The Heart of the Race – A New Photographic Tribute to the Unsung Heroes of the Mille Miglia. 2025.
