= Kogen =

Kogen may refer to:

== People ==
- Arnie Kogen (fl. 1960s–present), American TV comedy writer and producer and longtime writer for Mad Magazine
- Jay Kogen (born 1963), American comedy writer, son of Arnie Kogen
- Emperor Kōgen (孝元天皇, 278–153 BC), eighth emperor of Japan

== Other uses ==
- Kōgen (康元), an era of Japanese history from October 1256 to March 1257
- Kōgen Prefecture, an administrative division of Korea under Japanese rule corresponding to the historical Gangwon Province

== See also ==
- Kogan
- Kohen
