= Kaganovich (disambiguation) =

Kaganovich is a Jewish surname.

Kaganovich may also refer to:

- 16131 Kaganovich (1999 XV97), a main-belt asteroid
- Soviet cruiser Kaganovich, a Kirov-class battlecruiser
