= Great Khan =

Imperial title of Mongolic and Turkic societies

Great Khan
Rouran
Brahmi Script:	𑀓𑀕𑀦𑁆
Transliteration:	Kāgan
Transcription (Vovin):	Qāɣan
Mongolian
Mongolian Script:	ᠬᠠᠭᠠᠨ
ʼPhags-pa script:	ꡢꡖꡋ
Transliteration:	Qagan, Xagan
Cyrillic script:	Хаан / Хаган
Transliteration:	Xaan / Xagan
Yeniseian
Latin alphabet:	Qaγan
Arabic
Arabic script:	خاقان
Transliteration:	Ḵāqān
Assamese, Bengali
Bengali-Assamese:	খাকান / খাগান
Transliteration:	Khākān / Khāgān
Gujarati
Gujarati:	ખાકાન
Transliteration:	Khākān
Hindustani
Devanagari: (Hindi)	ख़ाक़ान
Transliteration:	Xāqān
Nasta'liq: (Urdu)	خاقان
Transliteration:	Xāqān
Punjabi
Gurumukhi:	ਖ਼ਾਕ਼ਾਨ
Transliteration:	Xāqān
Shahmukhi:	خاقان
Transliteration:	Xāqān
Old Turkic
Latin alphabet:	Qağan / Kaɣan
Old Turkic:	𐰴𐰍𐰣
Turkish
Anatolian Turkish language:	Kağan, Kaan, Hakan
Ottoman Turkish language / Latin alphabet transliteration:	خاقان / Ḫāḳan
Azerbaijani
Latin alphabet:	Xaqan
Kazakh
Cyrillic script:	Қаған
Latin alphabet:	Qağan
Kyrgyz
Cyrillic script:	Каган
Pronunciation:	[qɑˈʁɑn]
Russian, Ukrainian
Cyrillic script:	Каган
Latin alphabet:	Kagan
Hungarian
Latin alphabet:	Kagán
Chinese
Traditional Chinese:	可汗
Simplified Chinese:	可汗
Hanyu Pinyin:	Kèhán
Persian
Persian alphabet:	خاقان
Latin alphabet:	Xāqān
Korean
Hangul:	가한
Hanja:	可汗
Revised Romanization:	Gahan
McCune–Reischauer:	Kahan
Uyghur
Uyghur	قاغان
Uyghur latin	Qaghan

Great Khan, also known as Khagan or Qaghan (Middle Mongol:ᠬᠠᠭᠠᠨ; Khaan or Khagan; Old Turkic: 𐰴𐰍𐰣 Qaɣan; Kazakh: Қаған/Qağan) (Note: Also Ottoman Turkish: خاقان, romanized: Ḫākan, or خان Ḫān, Turkish: Kağan or Hakan; Uyghur: قاغان, romanized: Qaghan, Mongolian Script: ᠬᠠᠭᠠᠨ; Chinese: 可汗; pinyin: Kèhán or Chinese: 大汗; pinyin: Dàhán; Persian: خاقان, romanized: Xāqān Xāqān, alternatively spelled Khāqān Kağan, Kagan, Khaghan, Kaghan, Khakan, Khakhan, Khaqan, Xagahn, Qaghan, Chagan, Khaan, or Kha'an), is a title of imperial rank in Mongolic, Turkic, and some other languages, equal to the status of emperor and someone who rules a khaganate (empire). The female equivalent is Khatun. The common western rendering of Great Khan (or Grand Khan), notably in the case of the Mongol Empire, is a translation of Yekhe Khagan (Great Emperor or Их Хаан).

It may also be translated as "Khan of Khans", equivalent to King of Kings. In modern Mongolic, Khagan became Khaan with the g sound becoming almost silent (Note: i.e. a very light voiceless velar fricative) or non-existent; the ğ in modern Turkish Kağan is also silent. After the division of the Mongol Empire, monarchs of the Yuan dynasty and the Northern Yuan held the title of Khagan. Kağan, Hakan and Kaan, Turkish equivalents of the title are common Turkish names in Turkey.

== Etymology ==
The term is of unknown origin and might be a loanword from the Rouran language. Canadian sinologist Edwin G. Pulleyblank first suggested that a Xiongnu title, transcribed as 護于 (Old Chinese: *hʷaʔ-hʷaʰ) might have been the original behind Turkic qaɣan ~ xaɣan. According to Alexander Vovin the term comes from qaγan (meaning "emperor" or "supreme ruler") and was later borrowed and used in several languages, especially in Mongolic.

Turkic and Mongolic (or Para-Mongolic) origin has been suggested by a number of scholars including Ramstedt, Shiratori, Pulleyblank, Sinor and Doerfer, and was reportedly first used by the Xianbei, as recorded in Book of Song. While Sinor believes qaγan or qapγan is an intensification of qan just as qap-qara is an intensification of qara "black", in Turkic (with the eventual loss of the p), Shiratori rejects a Turkic etymology, instead supporting a Mongolic origin for both qan and the female form qatun.

Dybo (2007) suggests that the ultimate etymological root of Khagan comes from the Middle Iranian *hva-kama- ‘self-ruler, emperor’. Savelyev & Jeong (2020) note that both the etymological root for Khagan and its female equivalent Khatun may be derived from Eastern Iranian languages, specifically from "Early Saka *hvatuñ, cf. the attested Soghdian words xwt'w ‘ruler’ (< *hva-tāvya-) and xwt'yn ‘wife of the ruler’ (< *hva-tāvyani)".

== History ==
The title was first seen in a speech between 283 and 289, when the Xianbei chief Tuyuhun tried to escape from his younger stepbrother Murong Hui, and began his route from the Liaodong Peninsula to the areas of Ordos Desert. In the speech one of Murong's generals, Yinalou, addressed him as kehan (Chinese: 可寒, later Chinese: 可汗); some sources suggests that Tuyuhun might also have used the title after settling at Qinghai Lake in the 3rd century.

The Rouran Khaganate (330–555) was the first people to use the titles Khagan and Khan for their emperors, replacing the Chanyu of the Xiongnu, whom Grousset and others assume to be Turkic. The Rourans were stated to be descendants of the Donghu people, who in turn are assumed to be proto-Mongols, Mongolic-speaking, or a "non-Altaic" group.

The Avar Khaganate (567–804), who may have included Rouran elements after the Göktürks crushed the Rouran ruling Mongolia, also used this title. The Avars invaded Europe, and for over a century ruled the Carpathian region. Westerners Latinized the title "Khagan" into "Gaganus" (in Historia Francorum), "Cagan" (in the Annales Fuldenses), or "Cacano" (in the Historia Langobardorum).

== Mongol khagans ==
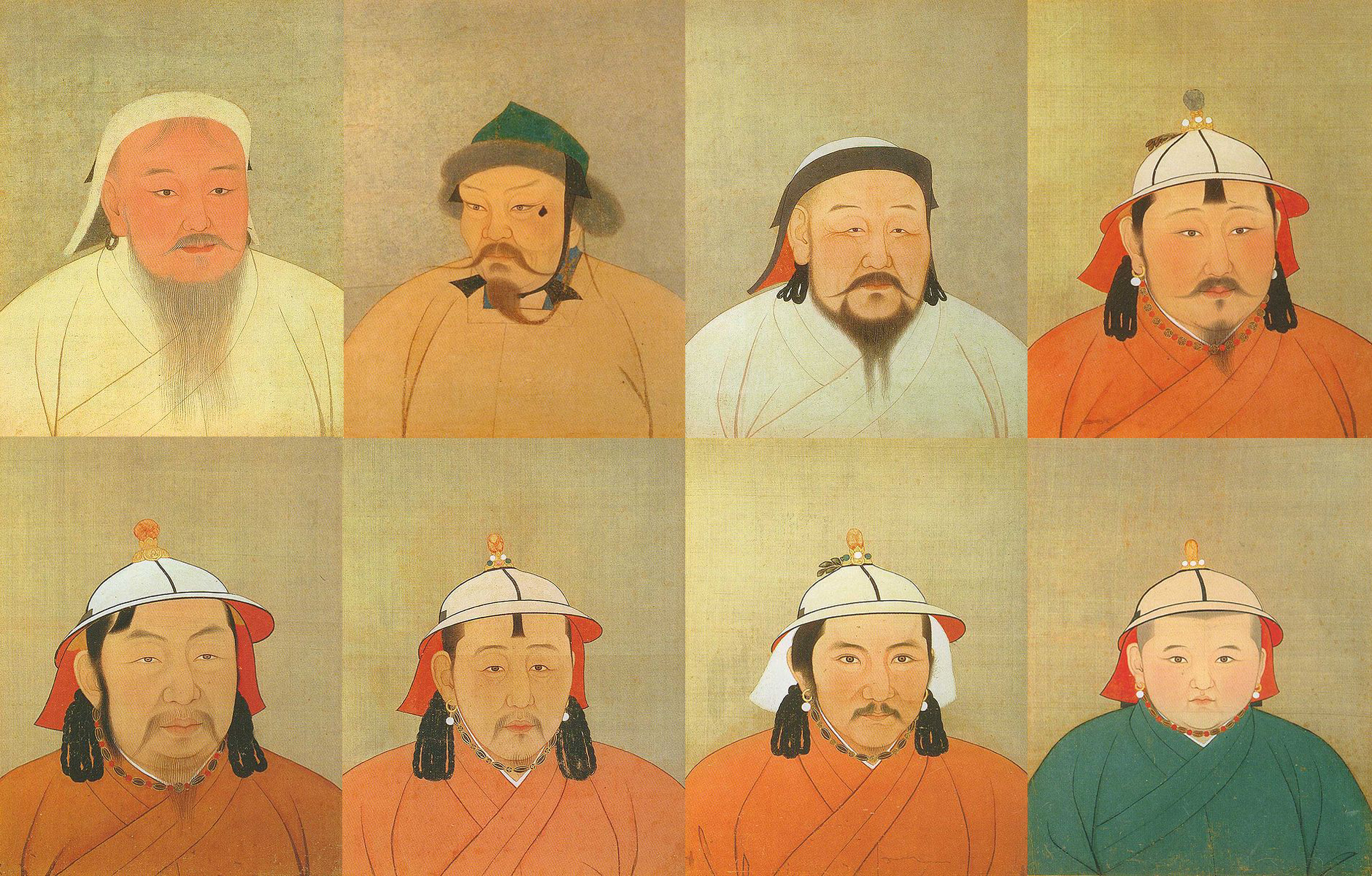
8 of 15 khagans of the Mongol Empire (Yuan-era pictures)

The Secret History of the Mongols, written for that very dynasty, clearly distinguishes Khagan and Khan: only Genghis Khan and his ruling descendants are called Khagan, while other rulers are referred to as Khan. The title "Khagan" or "Khaan" most literally translates to "great/supreme ruler" in the Mongol language, and by extension "sovereign", "monarch", "high king", or "emperor". The title can also be expanded with the addition of "Yekhe" (meaning "great" or "grand") to produce "Yekhe Khagan", meaning "Great Emperor".

The Mongol Empire began to split politically with the Toluid Civil War during 1260–1264 and the death of Kublai Khan in 1294, but the term Ikh Khagan (Great Khan, or Emperor) was still used by the emperors of the Yuan dynasty (1271–1368), who also took on the title of the Emperor of China. After the fall of the Yuan dynasty, the title continued to be used by monarchs of the Northern Yuan dynasty.

Thus, the Yuan is sometimes referred to as the Empire of the Great Khan, coexisting with the other independent Mongol-ruled khanates in the west, including the Chagatai Khanate and Golden Horde. Only the Ilkhanate truly recognized the Yuan's overlordship as allies (although it was effectively autonomous). Because Kublai founded the Yuan, the members of the other branches of the Borjigin could take part in the election of a new Khagan as the supporters of one or other of the contestants, but they could not enter the contest as candidates themselves.

Later, (Note: Beginning in the last years (1304) of Temür Khan, grandson of Kublai; most medieval historians such as Rashid al-Din and Alugh Beg Mirza described him as Grand khaan. See: Universal history and The Shajrat ul Atrak) Yuan emperors made peace with the three western khanates of the Mongol Empire and were considered as their nominal suzerain. The nominal supremacy, while based on nothing like the same foundations as that of the earlier khagans (such as the continued border clashes among them), did last for a few decades, until the Yuan dynasty collapsed in 1368. (Note: During this period the Mongol emperors of the Yuan held the (nominal) title of Great Khan of all Mongol Khanates (of the Mongol Empire), of which the three western Mongol khanates still showed their respect in several cases. For example, the Ilkhans' coins carried the Khagan's name up until the early 14th century. It was also once said that Khagan is "the blessing of the creator" at the court of the Golden Horde during the reign of Ozbek Khan (1313–1341).)

After the breakdown of Mongol Empire and the fall of the Yuan dynasty in the mid-14th century, the Mongols turned into a political turmoil. Dayan Khan (1464–1517/1543) once revived the Emperor's authority and recovered its reputation on the Mongolian Plateau, but with the distribution of his empire among his sons and relatives as fiefs it again caused decentralized rule. The last Khagan of the Chahars, Ligdan Khan, died in 1634 while fighting the Jurchen-led Later Jin dynasty. In contemporary Mongolian language the words "Khaan" and "Khan" have different meanings, while English language usually does not differentiate between them. The title is also used as a generic term for a king or emperor (as эзэн хаан, ezen khaan), as in "Испанийн хаан Хуан Карлос" (Ispaniin khaan Khuan Karlos, "king/khaan of Spain Juan Carlos").

The early khagans of the Mongol Empire were:

1. Genghis Khan (1206–1227; 21 years)
2. Ögedei Khan (1229–1241; 12 years)
3. Güyük Khan (1246–1248; 2 years)
4. Möngke Khan (1251–1259; 8 years)

== Among Turkic peoples ==
The title became associated with the Ashina ruling clan of the Göktürks and their dynastic successors among such peoples as the Khazars (cf. the compound military title Khagan Bek). Minor rulers were rather relegated to the lower title of khan.

Both Khagan as such and the Turkish form Hakan, with the specification in Arabic al-Barrayn wa al-Bahrayn (meaning literally "of both lands and both seas"), or rather fully in Ottoman Turkish Hakan ül-Berreyn vel-Bahreyn, were among the titles in the official full style of the Great Sultan (and later Caliph) of the Ottoman Empire, reflecting the historical legitimation of the dynasty's rule as political successor to various conquered (often Islamised) states. (The title began: Sultan Hân N.N., Padishah, Hünkar, Sovereign of the House of Osman, Sultan of Sultans, Khan of Khans, Commander of the Faithful and Successor of the Prophet of the Lord of the Universe; next followed a series of specifically "regional" titles, starting with Protector of the Holy Cities of Mecca, Medina and Jerusalem.)

"Khagan" is the second title of Safavid and Qajar shahs (kings) of Iran. For example, Agha Mohammad Khan Qajar and Fath-Ali Shah Qajar, as well as the other Qajar shahs, used this title. The nickname of the Safavid shahs, such as Shah Ismail I, was Kagan-e Suleyman shan (Khagan with the glory of Solomon).

=== Ottoman Empire ===
Ottoman rulers, after the 14th century, used only two titles "shah" and "khan" until end of the empire. Sultans like Mehmed the Conqueror and Suleiman the Magnificent used the title "Khagan of the two seas". Yazıcıoğlu Ali, in early 15th century, traced Osman's genealogy to Oghuz Khagan, the mythical ancestors of Western Turks, through his senior grandson of his senior son, so giving the Ottoman sultans primacy among Turkish monarchs. Though it was not entirely an imitation of Genghis Khanid doctrine, the Oghuz claim to sovereignty followed the same pattern. Bayezid I advanced this claim against Timur, who denigrated the Ottoman lineage.

== Chinese khagans ==
The Book of Wei, a Chinese history book, records that the title Khagan (可汗) and the title Huángdì (皇帝) are the same. Emperor Taizong of Tang was crowned Tian Kehan, or "heavenly Khagan" after defeating the Tujue (Göktürks). A later letter sent by the Tang court to the Yenisei Kirghiz Qaghan explained that "the peoples of the northwest" had requested Tang Taizong to become the "Heavenly Qaghan". The Tang dynasty Chinese emperors were recognized as khagans of the Turks at least from 665 to 705; moreover, two appeal letters from the Turkic hybrid rulers, Ashina Qutluγ Ton Tardu in 727, the Yabgu of Tokharistan, and Yina Tudun Qule in 741, the king of Tashkent, addressing Emperor Xuanzong of Tang as Tian Kehan during the Umayyad expansion.

The name "Chinese khagan" (Khāqān-i Chīn, "Khagan of China") referring to the ruler of China (i.e. Emperor of China) as a symbol of power appeared in medieval Turco-Persian literature works like the great 11th-century epic poem Shahnameh, which were circulated widely in Persia, Central Asia, and Xinjiang. During the Manchu-led Qing dynasty which extended into Inner Asia by the 18th century, their Turkic Muslim subjects (and surrounding Muslim khanates like the Khanate of Kokand) associated the Qing rulers with this name and commonly referred to the Qing emperors as the "Chinese khagan" (Khāqān-i Chīn).

== Among the Slavs ==
In the early 10th century, the Rus' people employed the title of kagan (or qaghan), reported by the Persian geographer Ahmad ibn Rustah, who wrote between 903 and 913.

It is believed that the tradition endured in the eleventh century, as the metropolitan bishop of Kiev in the Kievan Rus', Hilarion of Kiev, calls both grand prince Vladimir I of Kiev (978–1015) and grand prince Yaroslav the Wise (1019–1054) by the title of kagan, while a graffito on the walls of Saint Sophia's Cathedral gives the same title to the son of Iaroslav, grand prince Sviatoslav II of Kiev (1073–1076).

== See also ==
- Mongolian nobility
- Khan (title)
- Beg Khan
- Kahansin
- Kavkhan
- Khaganate
- Qapaghan Qaghan
- Tughra
- Kaganovich
