= Coen =

Coen may refer to:

- Coen (name), a given name and surname
- Enrico Coen (1957), a British botanist
- Coen brothers, a U.S. filmmaker sibling duo
- Coen River, Cape York Peninsula, Queensland, Australia; named after Jan Pieterszoon Coen in 1623
  - Coen, Queensland, Australia; named after the Coen River
    - Coen Airport (IATA airport code: CUQ; ICAO airport code: YCOE), Coen, Cook, Queensland, Australia
    - Coen Carrier Station, Coleman Close, Coen, Shire of Cook, Queensland, Australia; a telegraph station
- Coen River (Costa Rica)
- Coen Tunnel, Amsterdam, Netherlands; named after Jan Pieterszoon Coen
  - Second Coen Tunnel, Amsterdam, Netherlands; next to the First Coen Tunnel
- Coen Tunnel (Mingo Junction), Ohio, USA; railway tunnel
- SS Jan Pieterszoon Coen, Dutch passenger ship
- Coen rainbow-skink (Liburnascincus coensis), a lizard

== See also ==
- Joachim Coens (born 1966) Belgian politician
- Élus Coëns, the Order of Knight-Masons Elect Priests of the Universe
- Coan (disambiguation)
- Cohen (disambiguation)
