= Kahn, Iran =

Kahn or Kahan (Persian: كهن) in Iran, may refer to:

- Kahan, Isfahan
- Kahn, Anbarabad, Kerman Province
- Kahn, Kerman, Kerman Province
- Kahan, Kuhbanan, Kerman Province
- Kahn, Ravar, Kerman Province
- Kahn-e Biduri, Kerman Province
- Kahn-e Nowruz, Kerman Province
- Kahn-e Safar, Kerman Province
- Kahan, Iran, Razavi Khorasan Province
- Kahn-e Bala (disambiguation)
- Kahn-e Nuk (disambiguation)
- Kahn-e Pain

== See also ==
- Kahn is a common element in Iranian placenames; see.
- Kahan is a common element in Iranian placenames; see.
- Khan, Iran (disambiguation)
