= Kahn (disambiguation) =

Kahn is a German derived surname, from the word for "small boat".

Kahn may also refer to:

- Kahn (game browser), enabling online multiplayer of IPX compatible games over a TCP/IP network
- Kahn's, an American meat processing and distribution company based in Ohio
- Kahn, Iran (disambiguation), places in Iran
- Kahn-e Bala (disambiguation), "upper Kahn", places in Iran
- Kahn process networks (KPNs), a distributed model of computation in network communications
- Kähn, an alias of Joseph McGann, British record producer and DJ based in Bristol
- Kahn Design, a British car modifier based in Bradford
- Kahn River, Indore, India
- The ICAO designation for Athens–Ben Epps Airport in Athens, a city in Clarke County, Georgia.

== See also ==
- Kan (disambiguation)
- Kaan (disambiguation)
- Caan (disambiguation)
