= Kann =

Kann may refer to:

- KANN, a radio station broadcasting
- Caro-Kann (- Defense), named after Marcus Kann
- Netrikkan, a 1981 Tamil film
- Omslag: Martin Kann, an album by the Swedish band bob hund
- S. Kann Sons Co., a department store in Washington, D.C.

== People ==
- Alphonse Kann (1870–1948), French art collector of Jewish heritage
- D.W. Kann, American filmmaker
- Edith Kann (1907–1987), Austrian botanist and phycologist
- Edouard Kann (born 1857), French composer
- Hans Kann (1927–2005), Austrian Jewish pianist, composer
- Kallista Kann (1895–1983), Estonian linguist and teacher
- Kraig Kann (born 1966), American television personality
- Lily Kann (1893–1978), German actress
- Moses Kann (died 1762), German rabbi
- Peeter Kann (1883–1943), Estonian military officer, jurist and judge
- Peter R. Kann (born 1942), American journalist, editor, and businessman
- Salme Kann (1881–1957), Estonian voice teacher and choir director
- Stan Kann (1924–2008), American collector of vacuum cleaners

== See also ==
- Cann (disambiguation)
- Kahn
- Cahn
- Kan (disambiguation)
- Can (disambiguation)
