= Khan, Iran =

Khan (Persian: خان) in Iran may refer to:

- Khan, Sistan and Baluchestan
- Khan, West Azerbaijan

== See also ==
- Kahn, Iran (disambiguation)
