= Cahn =

Cahn is a Germanized form of the Jewish surname Cohen, another variant of which is Kahn.

== People with the surname Cahn ==
- Andrew Cahn (born 1951), British civil servant
- Anne Hessing Cahn (c. 1930–2024), German-born American political author and arms control expert
- Audrey Cahn (1905–2008), Australian microbiologist and nutritionist
- Edgar S. Cahn (1935–2022), American professor, CEO of TimeBanks USA
- Edward Cahn (director) (1899–1963), American film director
- Edward Cahn (jurist), attorney and U.S. federal judge
- Ester Samuel-Cahn (1933–2015), Israeli statistician and educator
- Jean Camper Cahn (1935–1991), American lawyer and social activist
- John W. Cahn (1928–2016), American materials scientist and physicist
- Jonathan Cahn (born 1959), American Messianic minister and writer
- Julien Cahn (1882–1944), English businessman, philanthropist and cricket enthusiast.
- Lillian Cahn (1923–2013), Hungarian-born American businesswoman and designer, co-founder of Coach Inc.
- Marcelle Cahn (1895–1981), French painter
- Miles Cahn (1921–2017), American businessman, co-founder of Coach Inc.
- Miriam Cahn (born 1949), Swiss painter
- Robert W. Cahn (1924–2007), British metallurgist
- Sammy Cahn (1913–1993), American musician
- Susan Cahn, women's and LGBTQ studies historian

== See also ==
- Cahn-Ingold-Prelog priority rule
- Canadian Anti-Hate Network
- Caan (disambiguation), Kaan (disambiguation)
- Cann (disambiguation), Kan (surname), Kann (disambiguation)
