= Lisa Kahn =

Lisa Kahn may mean:

- Lisa B. Kahn, American economist
- Lisa Kahn (poet) (1921–2013), German-American scholar and poet
