= Robert Kahn =

Robert Kahn may refer to:

- Robert Kahn (composer) (1865–1951), composer and music teacher
- Robert Louis Kahn (1918–2019), psychologist and social scientist
- Robert Ludwig Kahn (1923–1970), professor of German studies and poet
- Robert Kahn (computer scientist) (born 1938), Internet pioneer
- Bob Kane (born Robert Kahn, 1915–1998), the co-creator of the comic book superhero Batman
