= Qan =

Qan or QAN can refer to:

- Genghis Khan, a Mongolian conqueror
- Qantas, an Australian airline
- Qan, a foodstuff made of curdled pig blood
- QAN, the Amtrak station code for Quantico station, Virginia, United States

== See also ==
- Kan (disambiguation)
- Quan, a family name
