= Kahn =

Kahn is a surname of German origin. Kahn means "small boat", in German. It is also a Germanized form of the Jewish surname Cohen, another variant of which is Cahn.

== Given name ==
- Kahn Fotuali'i (born 1982), New Zealand rugby-union player of Samoan origin
- Kahn Singh Nabha (1861–1938), Punjabi Sikh scholar, writer, anthologist, lexicographer, and encyclopedist

== Surname ==
- Albert Kahn (banker) (1860–1940), French banker and philanthropist
- Albert Kahn (architect) (1869–1942), American industrial architect
- Albert E. Kahn (1912–1979), American journalist
- Alex Kahn (born 1967), American artist
- Alexander Kahn (1881–1962), American lawyer and newspaper editor
- Alfred E. Kahn (1917–2010), American economist
- Alfred R. Kahn (born 1947), American businessman
- Anne-Marcelle Kahn, née Schrameck (1896–1965), first French woman engineer to graduate from l'École nationale supérieure des mines de Saint-Étienne
- Ashley Kahn, American jazz historian
- Aunia Kahn (born 1977), American artist
- Axel Kahn (1944–2021), French geneticist
- Barbara B. Kahn, American endocrinologist and professor
- Brian Kahn, American writer and radio host
- Brenda Kahn (born 1967), American singer-songwriter
- Charles H. Kahn, American philosopher
- Charles N. Kahn III (born 1952), American businessman
- C. Ronald Kahn (born 1944), American physician and scientist
- David Kahn (writer) (1930–2024), American historian, journalist and writer
- David Kahn (sports executive) (born 1961), American sports executive
- Dominique Strauss-Kahn (born 1949), French managing director of the International Monetary Fund (IMF)
- Emilie Kahn, Canadian musician
- Ely Jacques Kahn (1884–1972), American commercial architect
- Fritz Kahn (1888–1968), German doctor and graphic designer
- Gilles Kahn (1946–2006), French computer scientist, described Kahn process networks
- Gus Kahn (1886–1941), American musician and songwriter
- Gustave Kahn (1859–1936), French poet
- Hannah Kahn (1911–1988), American poet from New York City
- Harold L. Kahn (1930–2018), American historian
- Herman Kahn (1922–1983), American military theorist and futurologist
- Irving Kahn (1905–2015), American investor
- Israel Kahn (born 1988), Peruvian footballer
- Jean-François Kahn (1938–2025), French journalist and essayist
- Jeff Kahn (mathematician), American mathematician
- Jenette Kahn (born 1947), American comic book editor
- Julius Kahn (congressman) (1861–1924), American congressman
- Julius Kahn (inventor) (1874–1942), American engineer, industrialist, and manufacturer
- Larry Kahn (tiddlywinks), American tiddlywinks champion
- Laure Favre-Kahn (born 1976), French classical pianist
- Lehman Kahn (1827–1915), Belgian educationalist and writer
- Lisa B. Kahn, American economist
- Lisa M. Kahn (1921–2013), German-American scholar and poet
- Lloyd Kahn (born 1935), American publisher and author
- Louis Kahn (1901–1974), American architect
- Louis B. Kahn (1918–2012), American computer scientist and statistician
- Louis Kahn (admiral) (1895–1967), French admiral
- Lucian Kahn (born 1982), American singer, songwriter and guitarist of Schmekel
- Lucille Kahn (1902–1995), American actress and parapsychology advocate
- Madeline Kahn (1942–1999), American actress
- Michael Kahn (film editor) (born 1930), American film editor
- Michael Kahn (theatre director) (born 1937), American theater director and drama educator
- Morris Kahn (1930–2026), Israeli entrepreneur
- Oliver Kahn (born 1969), German footballer
- Otto Hermann Kahn (1867–1934), German-born American banker and patron of the arts
- Paul W. Kahn (born 1952), American legal scholar
- Philippe Kahn (born 1952), French-born American entrepreneur
- Reuben Leon Kahn (1887–1979), Lithuanian physician
- Richard Ferdinand Kahn (1905–1989), English economist
- Robert Kahn (composer) (1865–1951), German composer
- Robert Kahn (computer scientist) (born 1938), American electrical engineer, developer of the TCP and IP protocols
- Robert Louis Kahn (1918–2019), psychologist and social scientist
- Robert Ludwig Kahn (1923–1970), professor of German studies and poet
- Roger Kahn (1927–2020), American author and sports journalist
- Roger Wolfe Kahn (1907–1962), American jazz musician
- Ruth Ward Kahn (1872–?), American writer
- Sam Kahn (1911–1987), South African anti-apartheid politician, activist and lawyer
- Tom Kahn (1938–1992), American social-democrat, civil-rights leader, and labor-union officer
- Yoel Kahn (1930–2021), American Chabad rabbi
- Zadoc Kahn (1839–1905), Alsatian-French rabbi

== Fictional characters ==
- Kahn Souphanousinphone, Hank Hill's neighbor in the television cartoon series King of the Hill
- Shao Kahn, a fictional character in Mortal Kombat video game series
- Kotal Kahn, a fictional character in Mortal Kombat video game series
- Commander Kahn, a character in the 2006 rhythm game Elite Beat Agents
- Noel Kahn, in the American TV series Pretty Little Liars

== See also ==
- Khan (title), historic Mongolic and Turkic title
- Khan (surname), surname in Central and South Asia
- Kan (surname)
- Caan (disambiguation); Kaan (disambiguation)
- Cann (disambiguation); Kann (disambiguation)
- Cohen
- Kahneman
