= Khan =

Khan may refer to:

- Khan (surname), including a list of people with the name
- Khan (title), a royal title for a ruler in Mongol and Turkic languages and used by various ethnicities
  - Genghis Khan, founder and first khan of the Mongol Empire

== Art and entertainment ==
- Khan (band), an English progressive rock band in the 1970s
- Khan! (TV series), a 1975 American police detective television series
- Khan (serial), a 2017 Pakistani television drama serial
- Khan Noonien Singh, a prominent Star Trek villain in an original series episode and the principal antagonist in Star Trek II: The Wrath of Khan (1982), then later Star Trek Into Darkness (2013)
- The title character of Citizen Khan, a British sitcom produced by the BBC
- Khan Doorman, Uzi Doorman's father from the web series Murder Drones (2021-2024)

== Radio ==
- KBGB, a radio station (105.7 FM) licensed to serve Kensett, Arkansas, United States, which held the call sign KHAN from 2011 to 2013

== Places ==
- Khan (Cambodia), an administrative unit of Cambodia
- Khan River, an ephemeral river in Namibia
- Khan River (India), also spelled Kahn

== Other uses ==
- Khan (inn), from Persian, a caravanserai or resting-place for a travelling caravan
- Khan Academy, a not-for-profit educational organization
- Khan Market, a market in Delhi, India
  - Khan Market metro station
- KHAN, an export version of the Turkish Bora ballistic missile

== See also ==
- Bakhchysarai Palace or the Khan's Palace, Bakhchisarai, Crimea
- Beg Khan, a surname
- Khanate (disambiguation)
- Khandan (disambiguation)
- Khanabad (disambiguation)
- Khangaon (disambiguation)
- Khanpur (disambiguation)
- Khanapur (disambiguation)
- Khana (disambiguation)
- Kahn (disambiguation)
- Kan (disambiguation)
- Caan (disambiguation)
- Han (disambiguation)
- Xan (disambiguation)
