= Kahnuk =

Kahnuk (Persian: كهنوك) may refer to:

- Kahnuk, Khash, Sistan and Baluchestan Province
- Kahnuk, alternate name of Kahnak, Nukabad, Khash County, Sistan and Baluchestan Province
- Kahnuk, South Khorasan
- Kahnuk Rural District, in Sistan and Baluchestan Province
