= Maciej Łukaszczyk =

Polish pianist

Maciej Łukaszczyk (11 March 1934, Warsaw – 4 June 2014, Poznań) was a Polish pianist.

== Life ==
Łukaszczyk was born in the capital city of Poland, Warsaw, in March 1934. During the German occupation of Poland during the Second World War, he and his twin brother Jacek Łukaszczyk (1934–2013) were engrossed with the music of Wolfgang Amadeus Mozart. In the '50s, he studied at the Higher State School of Music in Warsaw. His professors were Margerita Trombini-Kazuro, Zbigniew Drzewiecki, and Jan Ekier. Later he studied at the University of Music and Performing Arts, Vienna under Hans Kann. He became intensely interested in the music of Frédéric Chopin. In Inland and abroad, he became an interpreter of Chopin. In 1966, Łukaszczyk arrived in Darmstadt, and initially worked there as a Répétiteur at the Landestheater Darmstadt.

In 1970, he founded the Chopin-Gesellschaft in Darmstadt, of whom he was president for 44 years. The Chopin-Gesellschaft organized concerts, piano competitions, and master courses of the supraregional music of Chopin. Łukaszczyk persistently campaigned for comprehension between Poland and Germany.

He died in 2014, and was buried at the cemetery in Poronin.

== Distinctions ==
- 1991: Tribute for Order of Merit of the Federal Republic of Germany
- 1999: Order of Merit of the Republic of Poland
- 2004: Johann-Heinrich-Merck-Distinction of the city Darmstadt
