= Kahn-e Nuk =

Kahn-e Nuk (Persian: كهن نوك) may refer to:

- Kahn-e Nuk, Khash
- Kahn-e Nuk, Nukabad, Khash County
