= Khanate (disambiguation) =

A khanate is a state under the rule of a khan ("ruler" in Mongolic and Turkic languages).

Khanate may also refer to:

- Khanate (band), an American drone metal band
- Khanate (album), the band's self-titled debut album

== See also ==
- Khan (disambiguation)
