= Kahn, Kerman =

Kahn كهن
- Village
- Location within Iran
- Coordinates: 30°45′00″N 57°02′00″E
- Country: Iran
- Province: Kerman
- County: Kerman
- Bakhsh: Chatrud
- Rural District: Kavirat

Population (2006)
  - Total: 25
- Time zone: UTC+3:30 (IRST)
  - Summer (DST): UTC+4:30 (IRDT)

Kahn (Persian: كهن; also known as Kahn-e Sabz and Kahn-e Seh) is a village in Kavirat Rural District, Chatrud District, Kerman County, Kerman Province, Iran. At the 2006 census, its population was 25, in 5 families.
