= Kahn-e Safar =

Kahn-e Safar كهن صفر
- Village
- Interactive map of Kahn-e Safar
- Country: Iran
- Province: Kerman
- County: Qaleh Ganj
- Bakhsh: Chah Dadkhoda
- Rural District: Rameshk

Population (2006)
  - Total: 58
- Time zone: UTC+3:30 (IRST)
  - Summer (DST): UTC+4:30 (IRDT)

Kahn-e Safar (Persian: كهن صفر, also Romanized as Kahn-e Şafar) is a village in Rameshk Rural District, Chah Dadkhoda District, Qaleh Ganj County, Kerman Province, Iran. At the 2006 census, its population was 58, in 12 families.
