= Robert Ludwig Kahn =

German-American scholar (1923–1970)

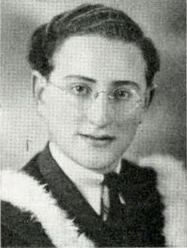
- Kahn's 1945 Dalhousie University yearbook photo
- Born: Ludwig Robert Kahn; April 22, 1923; Nuremberg, Bavaria, German Republic
- Died: March 22, 1970 (aged 46); Round Top, Texas, U.S.
- Cause of death: Suicide
- Citizenship: American
- Spouse: Lisa Kahn (m. 1951)

Academic background
- Education: Dalhousie University
- Alma mater: University of Toronto
- Thesis: Kotzebue, His Social and Political Attitudes. The Dilemma of a Popular Dramatist in Times of Social Change (1950)
- Doctoral advisor: Hermann Boeschenstein

Academic work
- Discipline: Germanist
- Institutions: University of Washington, Rice University
- Notable students: Hanna Lewis, Egon Schwarz
- Main interests: German literature
- Notable works: Edition of Georg Forster's A Voyage Round the World

Robert Ludwig Kahn (April 22, 1923 – March 22, 1970) was a German-American scholar of German studies and poet. He grew up in Nuremberg and Leipzig as the son of Jewish parents who sent him abroad to England on a Kindertransport in 1939. After the end of World War II, Kahn learned his parents had perished in the Holocaust, which was a traumatic experience that caused him to lose his faith. He never recovered from survivor's guilt.

After internment as an enemy alien on the Isle of Man and in Quebec, Canada, he was able to study at Dalhousie University with the help of a Halifax couple. He then obtained a PhD in German literature from the University of Toronto in 1950. Kahn's research interests were German literature in the Age of Goethe and Romanticism, and he was one of the editors of Georg Forster's works. Kahn held academic positions in German studies at the University of Washington and later as professor of German at Rice University from 1962, where he served as department chairman for several years until shortly before his 1970 suicide.

Kahn's poetry was not widely read during his lifetime. A collection of his German-language poetry was published in 1978, edited by his widow, the poet Lisa Kahn.

== Early life and education ==
Kahn was born as Ludwig Robert Kahn in Nuremberg, the second child of Beatrice (née Freudenthal, 1896–1943) and Gustav Kahn (1884–1942), a Jewish businessman. His maternal grandfather was the liberal rabbi Max Freudenthal. He was educated at a Jewish school in Nuremberg from 1929 to 1933, then from 1933 to 1939 at the Höhere Israelitische Schule (later named after its founding director Ephraim Carlebach), the Jewish gymnasium in Leipzig. Kahn's parents moved to Leipzig, which had a large Jewish community, as life in Nuremberg was becoming increasingly unbearable for Jews. However, they were not free from Nazi persecution. In 1938, Kahn's older sister, Susan Freudenthal (née Gertrud Suse Kahn, 1920–2016), emigrated to the United States, aided by her uncle, Josef Freudenthal, who was unable to pay for Kahn's emigration. Following the mass arrests after Kristallnacht in November 1938, Gustav Kahn was imprisoned at Buchenwald and Sachsenhausen concentration camps, and released again in February 1939.

Kahn's family attempted to escape from Germany, but their plans to emigrate to the United States failed. On May 10, 1939, Kahn was sent to England with a Kindertransport. He attended Kendra Hall School in Croydon from 1939 to 1940 and West Ham Municipal College in 1940. After World War II began, Kahn's mother was no longer able to support him financially, so he worked in a tannery. He was interned in a camp on the Isle of Man as an enemy alien, then sent on to a camp on the Île aux Noix in Quebec, Canada. He was able to take classes in this camp, and passed the Junior and Senior Matriculations at McGill University in 1941 and 1942, respectively. Around this time, he changed the order of his names, calling himself "Robert". A Halifax Jewish couple took him in and gave him the opportunity to pursue university studies. He studied at Dalhousie University and obtained his BA in 1944 and his MA (in history and philosophy) in 1945, his thesis titled Goethe and the French Revolution. At Dalhousie, he was awarded the Avery Distinction and the Joseph Howe Poetry Award.

From 1945 to 1948, Kahn studied German Literature and Philology at the University of Toronto, and received a doctoral degree in German Literature in February 1950, with a thesis about dramatist August von Kotzebue. His advisor was the Swiss-Canadian Germanist Hermann Boeschenstein.

== Academic career and research interests ==
Kahn worked at the University of Washington in Seattle from 1948 to 1962, starting as Acting Instructor of German Language and Literature, becoming Assistant Professor in 1955 and Associate Professor in 1960. In 1961–1962, he held a fellowship of the Alexander von Humboldt Foundation for research at the Deutsches Literaturarchiv Marbach in Marbach am Neckar. During this time, he and his family lived in Stuttgart and became friends with Jewish literary scholar and philosopher Käte Hamburger. From 1962 until his death in 1970, Kahn was Professor of German at Rice University in Houston, where he served as Chairman of the Department of Foreign Languages in 1963–64 and as Chairman of the Department of Germanics from 1964 until 1970, when he was replaced after controversy on his leadership, related to political disagreements with colleagues. In February 1970, Kahn was offered a professorship at the University of Florida, but declined the post because he felt he could not leave his students at Rice.

Kahn's main research topics were German literature in the age of Goethe and in the Romantic Era. He published articles about authors such as Friedrich Schlegel, Ludwig Tieck, Novalis and about themes like the concept of Romanticism. Interested in travel writing, he wrote about Johann Gottfried Seume's travels to England. He also edited the first volume of the East German Akademie-Verlag's edition of the works of world traveler and revolutionary Georg Forster, A Voyage Round the World, and contributed to the fourth volume, which included related content. At the time of his death, he was contributing to Ernst Behler's edition of Friedrich Schlegel's letters, part of the Kritische Friedrich-Schlegel-Ausgabe, a critical edition of Schlegel's works.

Kahn's students include Wolfgang Justen, Marianne Kalinke, Hanna Lewis, Gertrud Bauer-Pickar, and Egon Schwarz.

== Personal life and death ==
During World War II, Kahn was in contact with his sister in Cincinnati and with family in New York, but had neither contact with nor information on his family in Germany. After World War II ended, he learned that both of his parents had perished in the Holocaust either by suicide or after deportation to an extermination camp: Kahn's father died on March 27, 1942, ingesting sleeping pills when the Nazis had taken his two sisters. Kahn's mother was deported to Auschwitz on February 17, 1943, and she was murdered there on February 26. Kahn had been very attached to his mother, and the news of her death was devastating. Kahn lost his religious faith and could never overcome the trauma of his survivor guilt.

In 1951, Kahn married Lieselotte Margarete Kupfer (1921–2013), who gained fame as Lisa Kahn, a poet and scholar of German studies. Lisa had spent the 1950–51 academic year at the University of Washington in the Fulbright Program. They had two children: Peter G. Kahn (born 1953) and Beatrice Margarete Kahn (born 1959). Robert Kahn became a US citizen in 1956, Lisa in 1958.

Kahn took his own life on March 22, 1970, on his ranch in Round Top, Texas, shortly after the beginning of spring break. In the Biographisches Handbuch der deutschsprachigen Emigration nach 1933–1945 (Biographical handbook of German-speaking emigration after 1933–1945), Kahn's suicide has been connected to defamation by adversarial Rice University faculty members, while literary scholar Klaus Beckschulte also cited his inability to recover from survivor guilt. His widow later described Kahn's "deep depression" as related to two great disappointments: the lack of success of his poetry and strong disagreements with his colleagues, and stated he was torn between feelings of love (especially for his mother), hate, and guilt.

== Poetry ==
Kahn had been writing since his student days, winning a prize for his poetry at Dalhousie. He wrote additional poems in German, but was disappointed by their critical reception and his difficulties in publishing them. Some of Kahn's poems were published during his lifetime in both German and American magazines, and his nürnberg wunderschöne stadt. ein zyklus, described as reminiscent of Paul Celan's Todesfuge, was broadcast on the German radio station Saarländischer Rundfunk in 1968. Kahn was invited to the 1966 meeting of Group 47 in Princeton and read some of his poems there with other authors including Erich Fried, Günter Grass, and Walter Jens. Kahn's reading came shortly after Peter Handke's famous speech, which dominated the meeting and there was subsequently very little interest in Kahn's poetry, to his great frustration. While he managed to talk to influential literary critic Marcel Reich-Ranicki, the latter was only interested in Handke. A collected edition of Kahn's poems, Tonlose Lieder (Songs without music), edited by Lisa and illustrated by Peter Kahn, was published in 1978. Besides his own poetry in German, Kahn also translated poems of Goethe and Nelly Sachs into English.

The annual poetry prize of the Society for Contemporary American Literature in German was named after Robert L. Kahn from 1988 to 2013, when it was renamed the Lisa & Robert Kahn Prize for Poetry in German.
