= Kahn-e Bala =

Kahn-e Bala (Persian: كهن بالا) may refer to:

- Kahn-e Bala, Hormozgan
- Kahn-e Bala, Sistan and Baluchestan
