= Kahn-e Nowruz =

Kahn-e Nowruz كهن نوروز
- Village
- Interactive map of Kahn-e Nowruz
- Country: Iran
- Province: Kerman
- County: Qaleh Ganj
- Bakhsh: Chah Dadkhoda
- Rural District: Rameshk

Population (2006)
  - Total: 76
- Time zone: UTC+3:30 (IRST)
  - Summer (DST): UTC+4:30 (IRDT)

Kahn-e Nowruz (Persian: كهن نوروز, also Romanized as Kahn-e Nowrūz) is a village in Rameshk Rural District, Chah Dadkhoda District, Qaleh Ganj County, Kerman Province, Iran. At the 2006 census, its population was 76, in 16 families.
