= Susan Cahn =

Women's and LGBTQ studies historian

Susan K. Cahn

Academic background
- Education: University of Minnesota
- Thesis: Coming on strong : gender and sexuality in women's sport, 1900-1960 (1990)

Academic work
- Institutions: University of Buffalo

Susan Kathleen Cahn is a historian known for her work on women's studies and LGBTQ topics. She is a professor at the University of Buffalo.

== Education and career ==
Cahn has a B.A. from the University of California, Santa Cruz (1981) and an M.A. from the University of Minnesota (1985). In 1990 she earned a Ph.D. from the University of Minnesota. In 1992 she joined the faculty at the University of Buffalo where, as of 2022 Cahn is an emeritus professor.

== Work ==
Cahn is known for her writing on women in sports, adolescence, lesbian history, and chronic illness. Her 1995 book, Coming on Strong: Gender and Sexuality in Twentieth-century Women's Sport examines the role of Title IX in gender equality in sports participation. The book won an award from the North American Society for Sport History, and a second edition was published in 2015. Her work on the rise of women's sports teams, and making women prove their sex has been covered in multiple news outlets. In 2012 she wrote about women growing up in the south in Sexual Reckonings: Southern Girls in a Troubling Age.

== Selected publications ==
- Cahn, Susan K. (1993). "From the "Muscle Moll" to the "Butch" Ballplayer: Mannishness, Lesbianism, and Homophobia in U.S. Women's Sport". Feminist Studies. 19 (2): 343–368. doi:10.2307/3178373. ISSN 0046-3663. JSTOR 3178373.
- Cahn, Susan K. (1994). "Sports Talk: Oral History and Its Uses, Problems, and Possibilities for Sport History". The Journal of American History. 81 (2): 594–609. doi:10.2307/2081175. ISSN 0021-8723. JSTOR 2081175.
- Cahn, Susan Kathleen (2003). Coming on strong gender and sexuality in twentieth-century women's sport. Cambridge, Mass: Harvard Univ. Press. ISBN 978-0-674-14434-7. OCLC 249720598.
- Women and sports in the United States : a documentary reader. Jean O'Reilly, Susan K. Cahn. Boston: Northeastern University Press. 2007. ISBN 978-1-55553-787-6. OCLC 794003770.
- Cahn, Susan K. (2012). Sexual reckonings : southern girls in a troubling age. Cambridge, Mass.: Harvard University Press. ISBN 978-0-674-06393-8. OCLC 768071804.

== Awards and honors ==
In 2013 Cahn was named a William S. Vaughn Visiting Fellow by Vanderbilt University. In 2015, Cahn delivered the John R. Betts lecture at the annual meeting of the North American Society for Sport History.
