= Kan language =

Kan may be :

- Gan Chinese, a group of Chinese varieties spoken in Jiangxi Province
- Kaansa language, a Gur language of Burkina Faso
- Kaan language, an Adamawa language of Nigeria
- Kan, a variety of the Mbay language, a Central Sudanic language of Chad and the Central African Republic
- Kan, a variety of the Guntai language of Papua New Guinea
