= Edouard Kann =

- Born: 28 February 1857; Paris, France
- Occupations: Composer, musician
- Era: Romantic era

Edouard Kann (born 28 February 1857) was a French composer and musician.

== Biography ==
Edouard Kann was born into a Jewish family in Paris, France, the son of a prominent banker. He received his musical education under Massenet for composition and A. Duvernoy for piano.

In 1895, he produced the oratorio Ruth at the Grand Théâtre of Lyons. This was followed by the two-act opera Gaitanne, which appeared at the Théâtre des Arts de Rouen in 1898 and the Théâtre Royal de Gand in 1900, and the one-act comic opera Maritorne, produced by the Théâtre de St-Malo. In the years following these works, Kann brought out several musical compositions, including Le Baptême du printemps!, Syrinx, and Lion Amoureux.

== Publications ==
- Au Bord de la mer. Valse pour piano. Paris: Choudens. 1879.
- Rêverie pour piano. Op. 2. Paris: Choudens. 1879.
- Gavotte (en ut min.) pour piano. Op. 3. Paris: Choudens. 1880.
- Pastorale pour piano. Paris: A. Quinzard. 1892.
- Gavotte (en fa) pour piano. Paris: A. Quinzard. 1892.
- Menuet! Poésie d'Armand Silvestre. 1893.
- Nocturne (pour violoncelle avec accompagnement de piano). Op. 6. Paris: A. Quinzard. 1893.
- Le Baptême du printemps! Poésie de Léon Durocher. Paris: A. Quinzard. 1894.
- Rêverie pour piano op. 2. Paris: A. Quinzard. 1894.
- 6 petites pièces pour piano. 2° Glockenspiel. Paris: A. Quinzard. 1894.
- Ruth; scène biblique, pour soprano et choeurs. Paris: A. Quinzard.
- Syrinx (Ballet). 1900.
