= Aunia Kahn =

American contemporary painter and curator (born 1977)

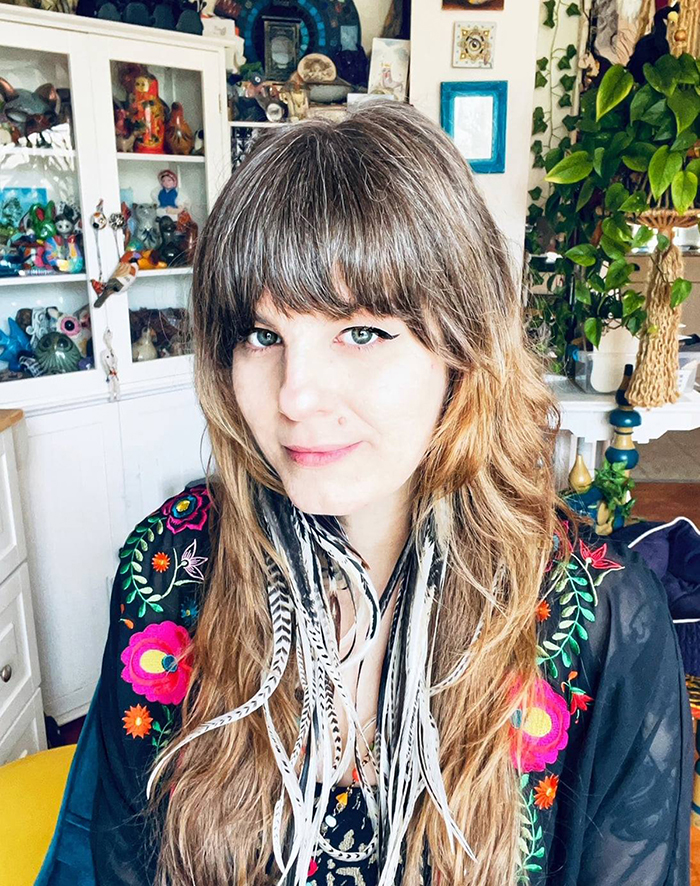
- Born: Detroit, Michigan, U.S.
- Education: Self-taught
- Known for: Painting / Mixed media
- Movement: Contemporary / Folk art
- Website: auniakahn.com

Aunia Marie Kahn (born December 5, 1977) is an American contemporary painter and curator. She was born and raised in Detroit, Michigan, and currently lives in Boise, Idaho.

Kahn's work was first exhibited publicly in December 2005 as part of the Voices Within Surviving Through the Arts show mounted by the St. Louis Artists' Guild. Her work has been shown at the San Diego Art Institute, Los Angeles Center for Digital Art, IMOCA, St. Louis Art Museum, Contemporary Art Museum St. Louis, Mitchell Museum, and the Jordan Schnitzer Museum of Art. Kahn has since exhibited widely across the United States and internationally, with work included in group and solo exhibitions at Thinkspace Projects, Modern Eden Gallery, and Harman Projects, among others across 10 countries.

Self-taught, Kahn works in gouache, acrylic, watercolor and colored pencil. Her Contemporary Symbolist Folk paintings weave symbolic storytelling with woman, symbols and nature.

Kahn's work has been featured in My Modern Met, Colossal, Create! Magazine, Prevention Magazine, and Booooooom.

An interest in tarot led to the creation of the Silver Era Tarot deck, published by Schiffer Publishing in April 2010. In October 2010, Kahn curated the Lowbrow Tarot Project, a collection of pieces loosely centered on the lowbrow art style, representing the 22 cards of the Major Arcana and a 23rd piece representing the back of the cards. The collection was exhibited at La Luz de Jesus gallery, Los Angeles, California, and was published as a coffee table book and a card deck. As well as Kahn herself, artists featured included Molly Crabapple, David Stoupakis, Chet Zar, Angie Mason, Daniel Martin Diaz and Chris Mars.

Her piece, Rousing the Whirlwind, was chosen by Les Bourgeois vineyard, Rocheport, Missouri, to appear on the label of its limited edition 2005 Syrah. The wine went on sale in 2007.

== Bibliography ==
- Folk Yeah Cats, Hyperlux Publishing, 2026 ISBN 979-8-9943675-0-6
- Minding the Sea: Inviting The Muses Over For Tea, Desperanto Publishing, 2012 ISBN 978-1-9371312-1-0
- The Art of Aunia Kahn, Alexi Era Publishing, 2018 ISBN 978-0-9916247-3-7
- Obvious Remote Chaos, Old Line Publishing, 2010 ISBN 978-0-9841065-9-2
- The Silver Era Tarot, Schiffer Publishing, 2010 ISBN 978-0-7643-3438-2
- Lowbrow Tarot: An Artistic Collaborative Effort in Honor of Tarot, Schiffer Publishing, 2012 ISBN 978-0-7643-4233-2
- Lowbrow Tarot: Major Arcana Cards, Schiffer Publishing, 2012 ISBN 978-0-7643-4235-6
- Inspirations for Survivors, Schiffer Publishing, 2012 ISBN 978-0-7643-4124-3
- The Witch's Oracle, Schiffer Publishing, 2014 ISBN 978-0-7643-4931-7
- Tarot Under Oath, Alexi Era Gallery, 2014 ISBN 978-0-9916-2470-6
- The Witch's Oracle 2nd Edition, Red Feather Publishing, 2019 ISBN 978-0-7643-5783-1
- Avalanche of White Reason: The Photography & Writings of Aunia Kahn, Lokreign, 2015 ISBN 978-0-9916-2471-3

== Curated Shows ==
- All Exhibitions, Poetic Tiger Gallery, 2024–present
- All Exhibitions, Alexi Era Gallery, Eugene, 2012–2017
- Tarot Under Oath, Last Rites Gallery, New York NY, 2014
- Touched By Violence, Framations Gallery, St. Louis, 2013
- Moon Goddess, Modern Eden Gallery, San Francisco, 2012
- The Lowbrow Tarot Project, La Luz de Jesus, Los Angeles, 2010
- Darkest Dreams a Lighted Way, Fort Gondo Compound for the Arts, St. Louis, 2008
- The Beauty From Within, ArtDimensions Gallery, St. Louis, 2006
- Art of Being a Woman, ArtDimensions Gallery, St. Louis, 2006

== Selected Press ==
- Beautiful Bizarre, Issue 53, Community Feature, 2026
- Art That Creeps, Strychnin Gallery and Korero, 2009, pp. 88–95 ISBN 978-0-9558336-7-0
- Mynameis issue 8, Graphotism, 2010, pp. 136–157
- Photographer's Forum, Best of College Photography, Serbin Communications, 2009, p. 64
