= Kaan =

Kaan may refer to:

== People, persons, titles, characters ==
- Kaan (name), a name
- K.A.A.N., abbreviation for Knowledge Above All Nonsense, an American rapper
- Kagan, a title for a ruler in Turkic and Mongolian languages
- Lord Kaan, a fictional character in the Star Wars Expanded Universe

== Places ==
- Kaan kingdom, a pre-Columbian state of the Maya civilization
- Ka'an Arcus, Ultima, 486958 Arrokoth (Ultima Thule), Kuiper Belt, Solar System; a circular region

== Other uses ==
- KAAN-FM, an American radio station
- KAAN (AM), an American radio station
- Kaan (film), a 2016 Indian film
- Kaan language, an Adamawa language of Nigeria
- Kaan: Barbarian's Blade, a video game
- TAI TF Kaan, a Turkish all-weather air superiority fighter under development

== See also ==
- KAAN-717, a gun
- Siaan Kaan or Uaxactun, an ancient ruin of the Maya civilization
- Caan (disambiguation)
- Kahn (German surname)
- Kan (disambiguation)
- Khan (disambiguation)
