= Kahn, Ravar =

Kahn كهن
- Village
- Location within Iran
- Coordinates: 31°05′54″N 56°42′32″E
- Country: Iran
- Province: Kerman
- County: Ravar
- Bakhsh: Central
- Rural District: Ravar

Population (2006)
  - Total: 78
- Time zone: UTC+3:30 (IRST)
  - Summer (DST): UTC+4:30 (IRDT)

Kahn (Persian: كهن) is a village in Ravar Rural District, in the Central District of Ravar County, Kerman Province, Iran. At the 2006 census, its population was 78, in 27 families.
