= D.W. Kann =

American film director

D.W. Kann is a film maker who has been working in the film industry for nearly 20 years. He started as a prop master, then make-up artist, art director, production designer, before moving on to editor, producer and director. He appears at festivals and conventions every year to promote his work.

Kann has directed, produced, and sold two feature films: Ancient Evil 2 and Prison of the Psychotic Damned, both of which he also edited. The films were sold to Silver Nitrate Entertainment and York Home Entertainment less than nine months after their initial principal photography start date.

In 2007 Kann worked with Ironopolis Media/Night Creature Films in England to produce and edit two feature films that played theatrically in the UK for several weeks and were shown at the 2008 Cannes Film Festival.

Kann was on the board of directors for the first annual Bram Stoker International Film Festival located in Whitby, England in October 2009.

== Darkside Films LLC ==
Darkside Films LLC is an independent film company specializing in the horror genre founded by D.W. Kann in 2001. Darkside Films first production was a 30-minute, award-winning short film entitled Dead Soul: A Fairy Tale. The company has since gone on to produce further short films as well as music videos, documentaries and feature films.
