= Hanna Lewis =

American editor and translator (1931–2022)

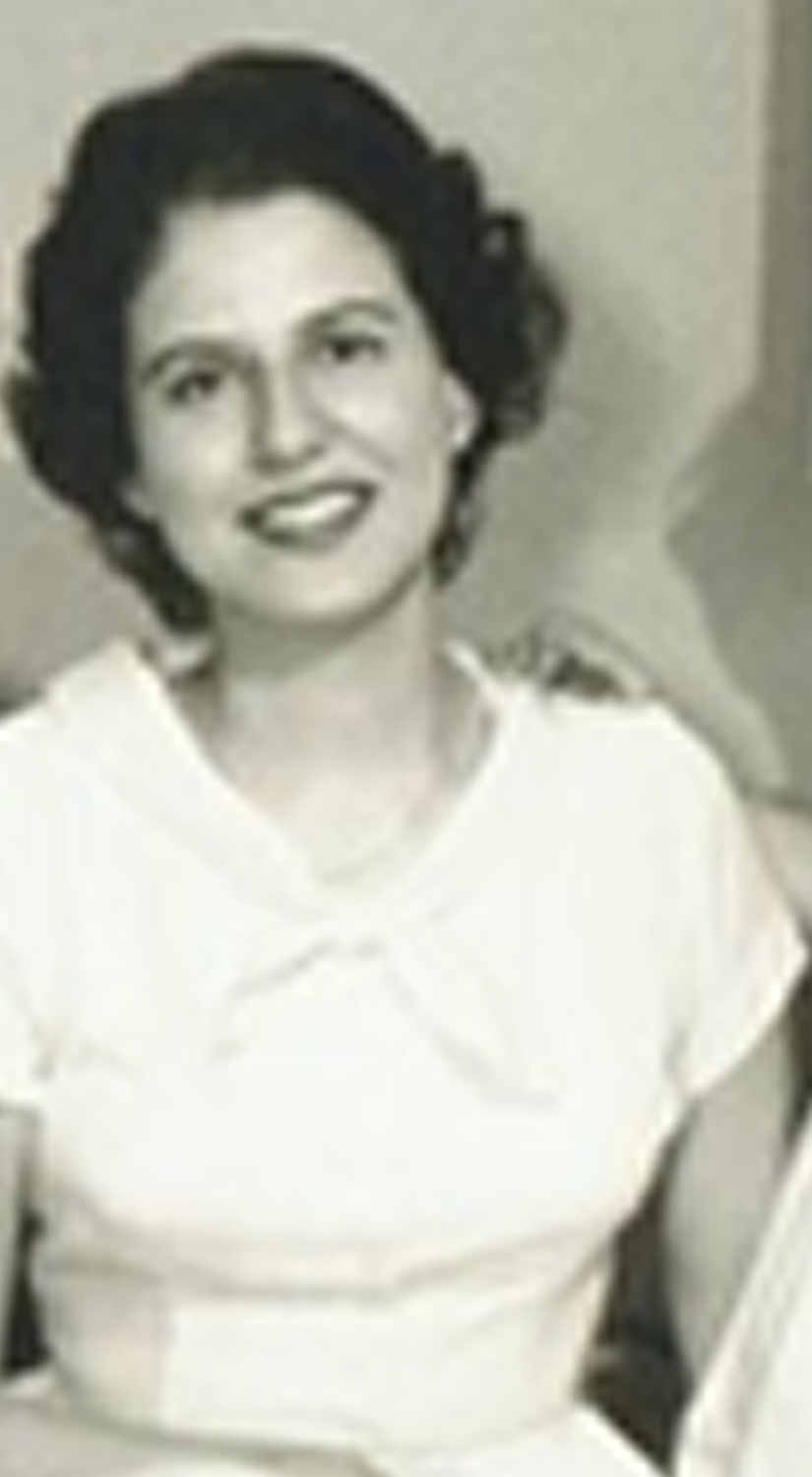
Hanna Ballin Lewis, approx 1963.

Hanna Ballin Lewis (20 August 1931 – 25 June 2022) was a German-American editor and translator. She is most known for her English language translations of German writer Fanny Lewald, including Lewald's Erinnerungen aus dem Jahre 1848, published as "Recollections of 1848", and an abridged version of Lewald's autobiography Meine Lebensgeschichte, titled "The Education of Fanny Lewald: An Autobiography". Lewis also published extensively on Hugo von Hofmannsthal and other modern German and Austrian writers.

== Biography ==
Hanna Lewis was born in Berlin, Germany, to Helmut (Jack) and Ilse Ballin. In October 1938, two weeks before the Kristallnacht pogrom, she immigrated with her parents to Philadelphia, USA, to flee Nazi persecution of Jews. Despite cultural and language hurdles, she graduated valedictorian at Olney High School in 1948. She was then awarded a full scholarship to the University of Pennsylvania, but transferred to Rice University in Houston after her marriage to Dr. Bernard M. Lewis in 1950. At Rice, she earned a bachelor’s degree in English and German, and later a master’s and doctorate in German, commuting three hours to attend classes while raising four children.

Lewis was a Germanics and Literature professor at Rice, Stephen F. Austin State University, and Sam Houston State University until her retirement in 1995.

Lewis died on 25 June 2022, at the age of 90.
