= Khan-e Sadr =

Khan-e Sadr خان صدر
- Village
- Location within Iran
- Coordinates: 38°53′39″N 44°17′19″E
- Country: Iran
- Province: West Azerbaijan
- County: Chaldoran
- Bakhsh: Central
- Rural District: Chaldoran-e Jonubi

Population (2006)
  - Total: 95
- Time zone: UTC+3:30 (IRST)
  - Summer (DST): UTC+4:30 (IRDT)

Khan-e Sadr (Persian: خان صدر, also Romanized as Khān-e Şadr; also known as Khān) is a village in Chaldoran-e Jonubi Rural District, in the Central District of Chaldoran County, West Azerbaijan Province, Iran. At the 2006 census, its population was 95, in 19 families. This number grow-up in 2021 census to a number of 200 citizens from 21 families from the entire world (13/05/2022 2h00 Source not professional psychiatric Victor Agüera Jaquemet (VAJ) - heard mentally - to be confirmed definitively by local censors and changed as appropriate by upper controllers therefor).
