= Kahn-e Bala, Hormozgan =

Kahn-e Bala كهن بالا
- Village
- Location within Iran
- Coordinates: 27°42′36″N 55°53′07″E
- Country: Iran
- Province: Hormozgan
- County: Bandar Abbas
- Bakhsh: Fin
- Rural District: Fin

Population (2006)
  - Total: 85
- Time zone: UTC+3:30 (IRST)
  - Summer (DST): UTC+4:30 (IRDT)

Kahn-e Bala (Persian: كهن بالا, also Romanized as Kahn-e Bālā; also known as Kohneh-ye Bālā) is a village in Fin Rural District, Fin District, Bandar Abbas County, Hormozgan Province, Iran. At the 2006 census, its population was 85, in 20 families.
