= Xan =

Xan may refer to:

- Xan (given name), a diminutive name derived from Alexander, Alexandra or Alexandria, or Galician for John
  - Xan Cassavetes (born 1965), American actress and director
  - Xan das Bolas (1908–1977), Spanish comic actor
  - Xan de Waard (born 1995), Dutch field hockey player
  - Xan Fielding (1918–1991), British author, translator, journalist and traveller
  - Xan Palay (born 1970), American illustration art sculptor
  - Xan Phillips, American poet and visual artist
  - Xan Tyler, British singer-songwriter
  - Xan McCurdy, Member rock band Cake
- Xan (vodka), produced by the Azerbaijani company Vinagro
- Xan (Baldur's Gate), a companion character from the Baldur's Gate series of computer games
- The final boss from the computer game Unreal Tournament and its sequels
- A book by Patrick Tilley about an alien invasion
- Slang for the drug Xanax
- The rap artist Lil Xan
- An alternate spelling of Khan (title)
- A character from the novel The Children of Men by P. D. James
- A legendary and ancient race in the popular MMORPG Anarchy Online
