= Caan =

Caan or CAAN may refer to:

- Caan (name), a family name (includes a list of people with this surname)
- Caan, Germany, municipality in Rhineland-Palatinate
- Civil Aviation Authority of Nepal
- Consenting Adult Action Network

== See also ==
- Kahn, a surname
- Khan (disambiguation)
- Kaan (disambiguation)
- Kan (disambiguation)
