= Kan =

Kan or KAN may refer to:

== People ==
- Kan (surname), including a list of people with the surname

=== In Japan ===
- KAN (born 1962), Japanese singer-songwriter
- Kan Kimura (born 1966), Japanese scholar
- Kan Otake (born 1983), Japanese professional baseball player
- Kan Shimozawa (1892–1968), Japanese novelist

== Places ==
- Kan (river), a tributary of the Yenisey in Russia
- Kan District of Iran
- Kan, Kyrgyzstan, a village in Batken Region
- Kananook railway station, Melbourne
- Kannapolis (Amtrak station), North Carolina, US, station code
- IATA code of the Mallam Aminu Kano International Airport at Kano, Nigeria
- Kansas, a U.S. state

== In language ==
- In Chinese, a dated transliteration of Gan
- One of several languages

== In media ==
=== Literature ===
- Kan, one of the Bacabs (deities) of Mayan mythology

=== Music ===
- KAN, UK folk supergroup with Brian Finnegan and Aidan O'Rourke
- Kan, the Israeli entry to the 1991 Eurovision

=== Television ===
- Kan (Hebrew: כאן, lit. 'Here'), the Israeli Public Broadcasting Corporation

== In science and technology ==
- KAN, the Iwasawa decomposition of a Lie group in mathematics
- Kan (貫), a Japanese unit of mass equal to 3.75 kg
- Kan (간), a Korean unit of length roughly equal to 2 meters
- Kanamycin A, a PDP ligand
- Kolmogorov-Arnold Networks, a type of artificial neural network architecture

== Other uses ==
- Club of Committed Non-Party Members (KAN), Czech Republic
- Variation of the Sicilian Defence in chess
- A string of Japanese mon coins

== See also ==
- Can (disambiguation)
- Kaan (disambiguation)
- Kahn (German surname)
- Kane (disambiguation)
- Kang (disambiguation)
- Kann (disambiguation)
- Khan (disambiguation)
- 幹 (disambiguation)
