= Edith Kann =

Austrian botanist (1907-1987)

Edith Kann (19 April 1907, Krems an der Donau – 7 October 1987, Vienna) was an Austrian teacher and botanist, specializing in phycology. She was a leading expert on blue-green algae.

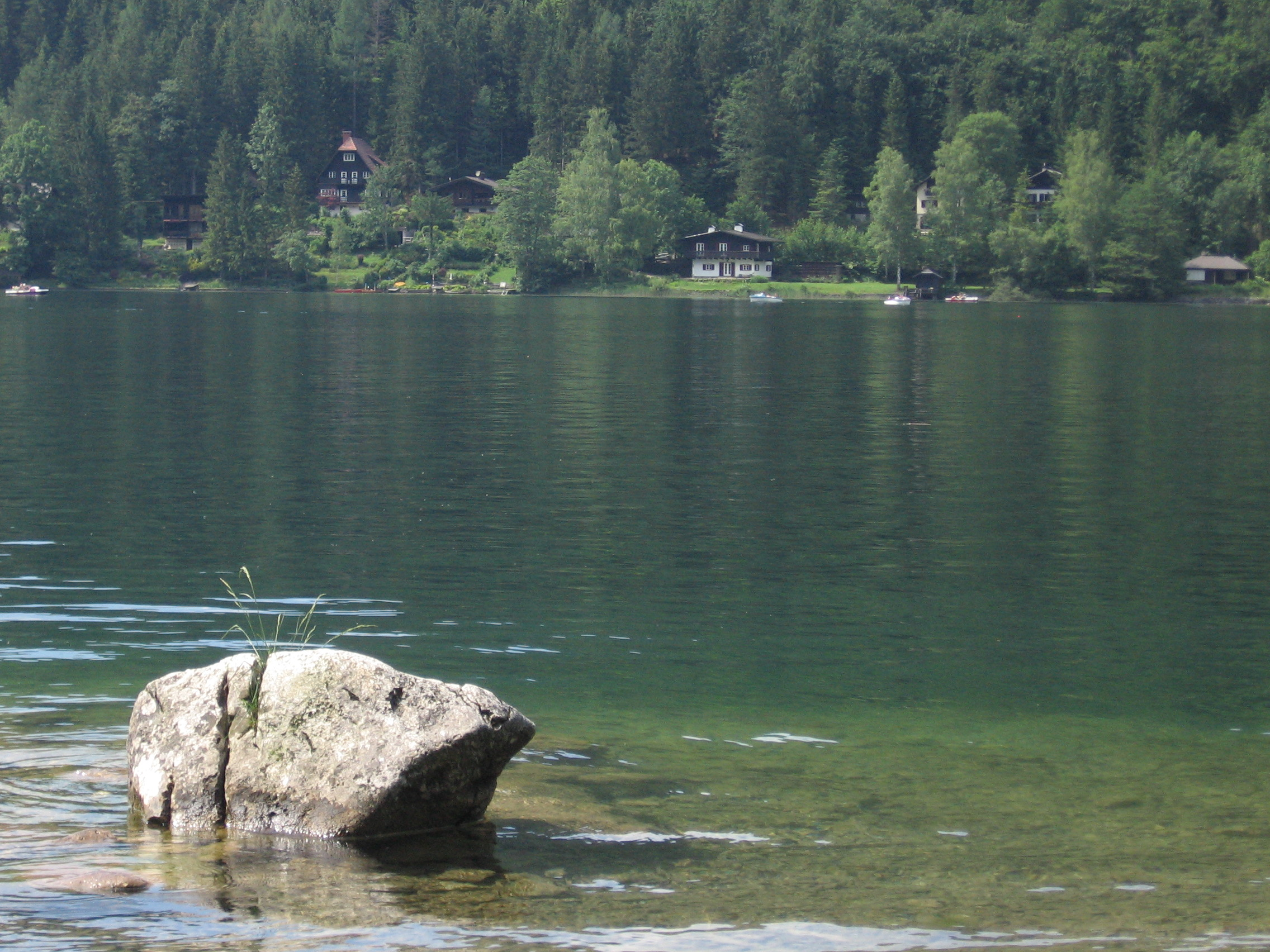
Lunzer See (Lake Lunz) as seen looking northward from the southern shore. When Kann worked here on her dissertation, only the house on the left was standing.

== Biography ==
Her father was a civil engineer and, in 1908, head of the construction project of the Wachau Railway in Willendorf when the famous Venus of Willendorf was found there on August 7, 1908. As a child, Edith Kann lived first in Spitz and from 1911 in Vienna. From 1918 to 1926 she attended the Realgymnasium for civil servants' daughters Vienna VIII, after which she completed the Lehramt (teacher qualification) for natural history and geography at the University of Vienna. In 1930 and 1931 she took part in limnological summer courses at the biological research station at Lunz am See and began her dissertation under Franz Ruttner (1882–1981) on the ecology of the littoral algae of the Lunzer See (Lake Lunz). On March 21, 1931, she received her doctorate "sub auspiciis Praesidentis" from the University of Vienna. On June 6, 1932, she passed her teaching examination. Because she became unemployed after the probationary year as a result of the global economic crisis, Kann went to Ankara as a private teacher from 1935 to 1936. When she returned to Vienna in 1937/38, she took a bioeconomics course at the university, but the final exam was abruptly cancelled due to the Anschluss.

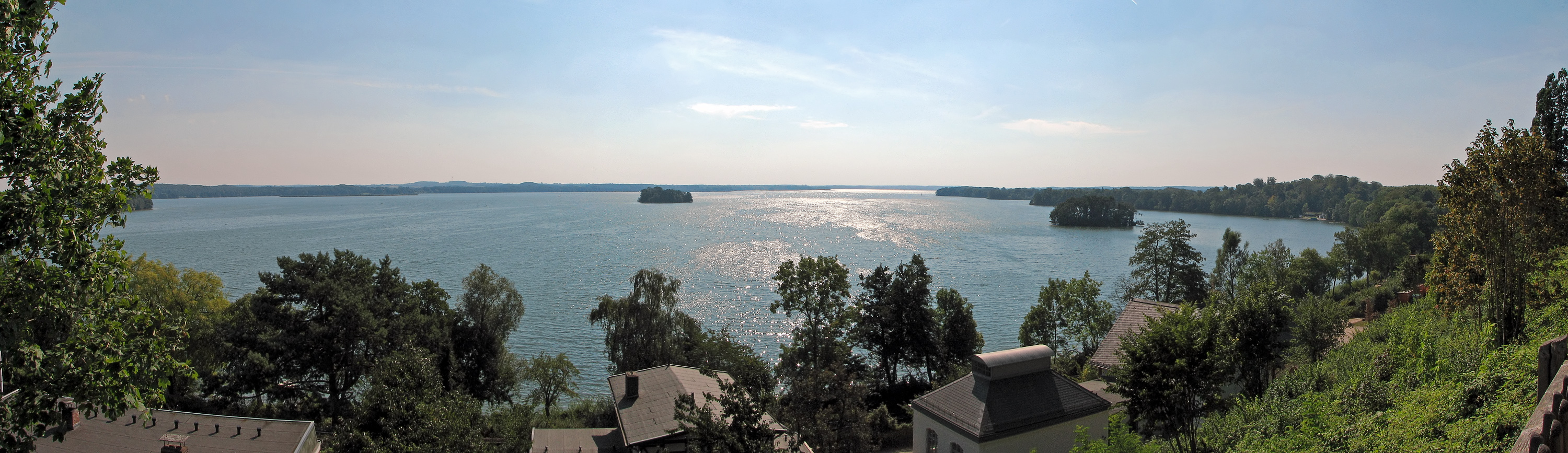
Großer Plöner See (Lake Plön), site of Kann's investigations in 1938–40.

For 1938–1940 she received a scholarship from the Kaiser Wilhelm Society to study the ecology of littoral algae at the Hydrobiological Institute in Plön under the supervision of August Thienemann. In 1943 her fiancé, the Plön hydrobotanist Hartmut Roll (b. 1914), was killed in action. From 1940 to 1967 she taught at several secondary schools in Vienna (most recently for many years at the Realgymnasium at Rahlgasse 4 — about half a kilometer from the Leopold Museum).

After WW II she continued her algae studies in Lunz during the summer months, using material from lakes at home and abroad — partly with the aim of being able to make statements about the water quality according to the Trophic State Index (TSI). In the school year 1962/63 she was on leave for this purpose. Her main interest was the blue-green algae (Cyanophyta) from lakes and rivers, for which she also became a specialist in phycological systematics and corresponded with experts on a worldwide basis. In 1959 she founded the International Association for Cyanophyte Research (IAC) with the Zurich limnologist Otto Jaag (1900–1978) with periodic symposia for cyanophyte research. She was often involved with lectures at SIL conferences and always at limnological summer courses at Lake Lunz.

Two cataract operations in 1979 and 1980 did not curtail her studies using microscopy. Not until 1987 did her phycological studies end — in that year, she suffered a devastating stroke on August 4 in Lunz and died on October 7 in Vienna.

She was the sole author of 30 publications and co-author of 6 publications.

== Eponyms ==
- Homoeothrix kannae (species named in honor of Edith Kann on the occasion of her eightieth birthday).

== Selected publications ==
- Kann, Edith (1933). "Zur Ökologie des litoralen Algenaufwuchses im Lunzer Untersee". Internationale Revue der Gesamten Hydrobiologie und Hydrographie. 28 (3–4): 172–227. doi:10.1002/iroh.19330280303.
- —— (1966). "Der Algenaufwuchs in einigen Bächen Österreichs". Sil Proceedings, 1922-2010. 16 (2): 646–654. Bibcode:1966SILP...16..646K. doi:10.1080/03680770.1965.11895742.
- Golubić, S.; —— (1967). "Zur Klärung der taxonomischen Beziehungen zwischen Tolypothrix distorta Kützing undT. Penicillata Thuret (Cyanophyta)". Schweizerische Zeitschrift für Hydrologie. 29 (1): 145–160. Bibcode:1967AqSci..29..145G. doi:10.1007/BF02502202. S2CID 1232920. 1967
- ——; Komárek, Jiří (1970). "Systematisch-ökologische Bemerkungen zu den Arten des Formenkreises Phormidium autumnale". Schweizerische Zeitschrift für Hydrologie. 32 (2): 495–518. Bibcode:1970AqSci..32..495K. doi:10.1007/BF02502564. S2CID 31327945. 1970
- —— (1972). "Zur Systematik und Ökologie der Gattung Chamaesiphon (Cyanophyceae). 1. Systematik". Algological Studies. Supplement Volumes: 117–171. (15 tables and 24 illustrations)
- —— (1973). "Bemerkungen zur Systematik und Ökologie einiger mit Kalk inkrustierter Phormidiumarten". Schweizerische Zeitschrift für Hydrologie. 35 (1): 141–151. Bibcode:1973AqSci..35..141K. doi:10.1007/BF02502068. S2CID 21949357. 1973
- —— (1976). "Zur Ökologie des Algenaufwuchses in Österreichischen Bergbächen". Verhandlungen der Gesellschaft für Ökologie Wien 1975. pp. 163–164. doi:10.1007/978-94-015-7168-5_24. ISBN 978-94-015-7170-8. 1976
- —— (1978). "Typification of Austrian streams concerning algae". Sil Proceedings, 1922-2010. 20 (3): 1523–1526. Bibcode:1978SILP...20.1523K. doi:10.1080/03680770.1977.11896723.
- —— (1978). Systematik und Ökologie der Algen österreichischer Bergbäche. Stuttgart: Schweizerbart; 238 pp.
