= Kahn-e Nuk, Nukabad =

Kahn-e Nuk كهن نوك
- Village
- Location within Iran
- Coordinates: 28°38′50″N 60°47′29″E
- Country: Iran
- Province: Sistan and Baluchestan
- County: Khash
- Bakhsh: Nukabad
- Rural District: Eskelabad

Population (2006)
  - Total: 72
- Time zone: UTC+3:30 (IRST)
  - Summer (DST): UTC+4:30 (IRDT)

Kahn-e Nuk (Persian: كهن نوك, also Romanized as Kahn-e Nūk; also known as Kahnūk) is a village in Eskelabad Rural District, Nukabad District, Khash County, Sistan and Baluchestan Province, Iran. At the 2006 census, its population was 72, in 23 families.
