= Lisa Kahn (poet) =

German-American academic (1921–2013)

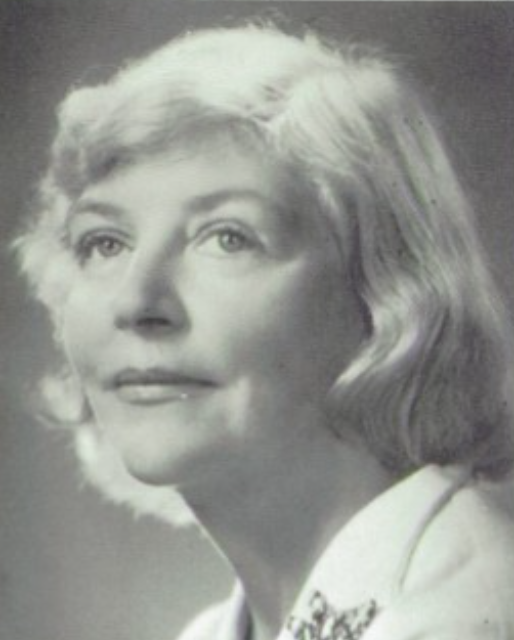
- Kahn in 1968
- Born: Liselott Margarete Kupfer; July 15, 1921 Berlin, Prussia, Germany
- Died: July 3, 2013 (aged 91) Houston, Texas, U.S.
- Citizenship: Germany; United States (after 1958)
- Education: Heidelberg University (PhD)
- Spouses: Robert Ludwig Kahn (m. 1951; died 1970); Herbert Finkelstein (after 1970)
- Children: 2

Liselott Margarete "Lisa" Kahn (née Kupfer; July 15, 1921 – July 3, 2013) was a German-American poet and scholar of psychology and German studies. She studied at the University of Heidelberg, where she obtained a PhD in psychology in 1953. She married the German-American scholar Robert L. Kahn and emigrated to the United States, where she was a teacher at The Kinkaid School from 1964 to 1968 and professor of German at Texas Southern University from 1968 to 1990, serving as head of the foreign language department from 1988.

In her scholarly work, Kahn was concerned with the experience of German-speaking immigrants to the United States, among other topics. She especially studied American women writing in German and edited an anthology of related work. As a poet, immigration and the related ambiguous feelings towards the home country were among her themes. She was one of the most productive American poets writing in German and was described as the "foremost German Texan poet" and a "prototypical example" of a German-American author. Kahn received several awards and distinctions including the Order of Merit of the Federal Republic of Germany in 1990.

== Life and career ==
Kahn was born as Liselott Margarete Kupfer in Berlin on July 15, 1921, as daughter of a merchant. She attended school in Leipzig, where she graduated with the Abitur in 1940. She then completed a Pflichtjahr followed by two years of work in an aluminum foundry and two years of service with the German Red Cross. After World War II, she worked as interpreter for the legal division of the US Office of Military Government in Württemberg-Baden. From 1948 to 1953 she studied psychology, German literature and English at the University of Heidelberg. She spent the academic year 1950/51 at the University of Washington sponsored by the Fulbright Program. She obtained a PhD in psychology in 1953 from the University of Heidelberg, with a 1952 thesis in social psychology entitled Versuch einer Sozialcharakterologie der dichterischen Gestalten des Naturalismus, "Attempt of a social characterology of the poetic figures of naturalism".

In 1951, she married Jewish German refugee Robert L. Kahn, also a poet and scholar of German studies. Robert Kahn had also lived in Leipzig in the 1930s, but they only met during her Fulbright year in the United States. They had two children, including her son Peter. Robert became a US citizen in 1956, Lisa in 1958. The family moved to Houston in 1962, where Robert was professor of German at Rice University until his 1970 suicide, and Lisa taught German and French at The Kinkaid School in Piney Point Village, from 1964 to 1968. From 1968 she was a professor of German at Texas Southern University. She became head of the foreign language department in 1988 and retired in 1990.

Lisa Kahn later married Herbert Finkelstein and converted to Judaism in 1973. She died in Houston on July 3, 2013. Kahn was a member of International PEN from 1982, of American PEN from 1985 and of PEN Austria from 1989. She received various distinctions and awards, including the Order of Merit of the Federal Republic of Germany in 1990 and was named Poeta Laureata by the University of New Mexico in 1993. For her contributions to German in Texas, she received the German-Texan Heritage Society's Ehrenstern award. The Society for Contemporary American Literature in German's annual poetry prize, named after Robert L. Kahn from 1988 to 2013, is now called the Lisa & Robert Kahn Prize for Poetry in German.

== Scholarship and poetry ==
Lisa Kahn was interested in literature about the experience of German-speaking immigrants to the United States. She surveyed and collected writing in German by American women writers, noting that the use of the German language helped keep their identity intact. She edited a volume of related prose and poetry, Reisegepäck Sprache, in 1979, that among other goals aimed to relieve the comparative lack of representation of women writers in literary anthologies. Reviewer Annelise Duncan from Trinity University praised Kahn's "sensitivity and expertise". Together with University of Cincinnati professor of German, Jerry Glenn, she produced an updated bilingual edition in 1983, In her mother's tongue. She also wrote about other authors including Ernst Jandl, Günter Kunert, Friederike Mayröcker and Kurt Tucholsky.

She wrote poems in English and German, and was one of the most productive German writing poets in the United States. After her first husband's suicide, her main themes were suffering and death. Starting in 1975 with Klopfet an, so wird euch nicht aufgetan, Kahn published her poetry and short prose in eighteen volumes. In 1978, she edited Tonlose Lieder ('Songs without sound'), a collection of poems by Robert, illustrated by her son Peter. The 1982 collection David am Komputer contained some poems made to look like computer programs and other plays on form. Reviewer Solveig Olsen called some of the poems "strong, direct, and classic in their simplicity." Kahn's 1984 bilingual volume From my Texas Log Cabin, contained texts about Texas and was also illustrated by Peter, and reviewer Glen E. Lich noted the effect of the "intertextual resonance of the facing translations". Reviewer Don Tolzmann noted Kahn's "unique perspective" and found the poems dealt "quite successfully with basic universal themes". Linda Moehle-Vieregge found the German poems "remarkable" but characterized the direct translation of some German compound words into English (for example, selbstgezimmert as "self-carpentered") as "irritating". The 1986 collection Flußbettworte / Fluvial Discourse was described by reviewer Rita Terras as "exceptionally broad" in range, using a wide selection of types of poetry and geographical settings. Some of her poetry books included English texts and reflected on her experience with immigration and bilinguality. Her book Kinderwinter, illustrated by her son, showed the tension of her mixed feelings towards Germany. The 1992 collection Atlantische Brücke portrays the experience of returning emigrants as a building of bridges. Some of Kahn's poems also have Jewish themes or concern the Holocaust.

Jerry Glenn described Kahn as "the prototypical example of an important author who is universally recognized as 'German-American'" in an article on the definition of German-American Literature. Don Tolzmann called her "without question the foremost modern German Texan poet".

== Publications ==
=== Poetry ===
- Kahn, Lisa (1975). Klopfet an, so wird euch nicht aufgetan: Gedichte. Darmstadt: Bläschke. ISBN 978-3-87561-387-2.
- Kahn, Lisa (1978). Feuersteine: Gedichte. Zürich: Strom-Verlag. ISBN 978-3-85921-040-0.
- Kahn, Lisa (1980). Denver im Frühling: Gedichte. Reihe lebendiges Fundament. Berlin: Stoedtner. ISBN 978-3-920907-08-6.
- Kahn, Lisa (1982). Utahs Geheimnisse: Gedichte. Reihe lebendiges Fundament. Berlin: Stoedtner. ISBN 978-3-920907-14-7.
- Kahn, Lisa (1982). David am Komputer und andere Gedichte. Providence, R.I: Trebush Press.
- Kahn, Lisa (1984). Bäume (in German). München: Galerie an der Treppe. OCLC 12353978.
- Kahn, Lisa (1984). From my Texan log cabin = Aus meiner texanischen Blockhütte. Austin, Tex. : Eakin Press. ISBN 978-0-89015-492-2.
- Kahn, Lisa (1984). Wer mehr liebt: Kurzgeschichten u. Märchen. Reihe lebendiges Fundament. Berlin: Stoedtner. ISBN 978-3-920907-25-3.
- Kahn, Lisa (1986). Kinderwinter: Gedichte. Reihe "Lebendiges Fundament". Berlin: Stoedtner. ISBN 978-3-920907-34-5.
- Kahn, Lisa (1986). Tor und Tür (in German). Galerie an der Treppe.
- Kahn, Lisa (1988). Krētē: fruchtbar und anmutsvoll. Berlin: Klaunig. ISBN 978-3-927427-00-6.
- Kahn, Lisa (1992). Krētē: fertile and full of grace; poems on Crete. Lewiston, New York: Mellen Poetry Press. ISBN 978-0-7734-9437-4.
- Kahn, Lisa (1992). Atlantische Brücke: poems. Lewiston, NY: Mellen Poetry Press. ISBN 978-0-7734-9569-2.
- Kahn, Lisa (1994). Today I commanded the wind: = Heute befahl ich dem Wind. Lewiston, New York: Mellen Poetry Press. ISBN 978-0-7734-0019-1.
- Kahn, Lisa (1998). Flussbettworte/fluvial discourse: poems. Lewiston, New York: Mellen Poetry Press. ISBN 978-0-7734-2839-3.
- Kahn, Lisa (2002). A bluebonnet trail of verses. Austin, Texas: Eakin Press. ISBN 1-57168-658-4. OCLC 52084120.

=== Children's books ===
- Kahn, Lisa (1997). Kälbchen-Geschichten. Edition Fischer. Frankfurt/Main: R. G. Fischer. ISBN 978-3-89501-495-6.
- Kahn, Lisa (1999). The calf who fell in love with a wolf : and other calf stories from Round Top, Texas. Austin, Tex.: Eakin Press. ISBN 978-1-57168-346-5.

=== Scholarship ===
- Kupfer-Kahn, Liselott Margarete (1952). Versuch einer Sozialcharakterologie der dichterischen Gestalten des Naturalismus (Thesis). o. O.
- Kahn, Lisa (1979). Reisegepäck Sprache deutschschreibende Schriftstellerinnen in d. USA 1938 – 1978 (in German). Wilhelm Fink. OCLC 174475199.
- Kahn, Lisa, ed. (1983). In her mother's tongue: women authors in the US who write in German 1938 - 1983 = Reisegepäck Sprache. Denver, Colorado: Emerson.
