= Kahn-e Pain =

Kahn-e Pain کهن پايين
- Village
- Location within Iran
- Coordinates: 26°00′12″N 60°55′39″E
- Country: Iran
- Province: Sistan and Baluchestan
- County: Qasr-e Qand
- Bakhsh: Talang
- Rural District: Talang

Population (2006)
  - Total: 215
- Time zone: UTC+3:30 (IRST)
  - Summer (DST): UTC+4:30 (IRDT)

Kahn-e Pain (Persian: کهن پايين, also Romanized as Kahn-e Pā’īn and Kohan-e Pā’īn; also known as Kahan, Kahan Barānī, Kahn, Kahnak, Kahn Balūchānī, Khān, Kohan Balūchānī, Kohan Balūchī, Kohan Barātī, and Ūshāb) is a village in Talang Rural District, Talang District, Qasr-e Qand County, Sistan and Baluchestan Province, Iran. At the 2006 census, its population was 215, in 50 families.
