= Lisa B. Kahn =

American economist

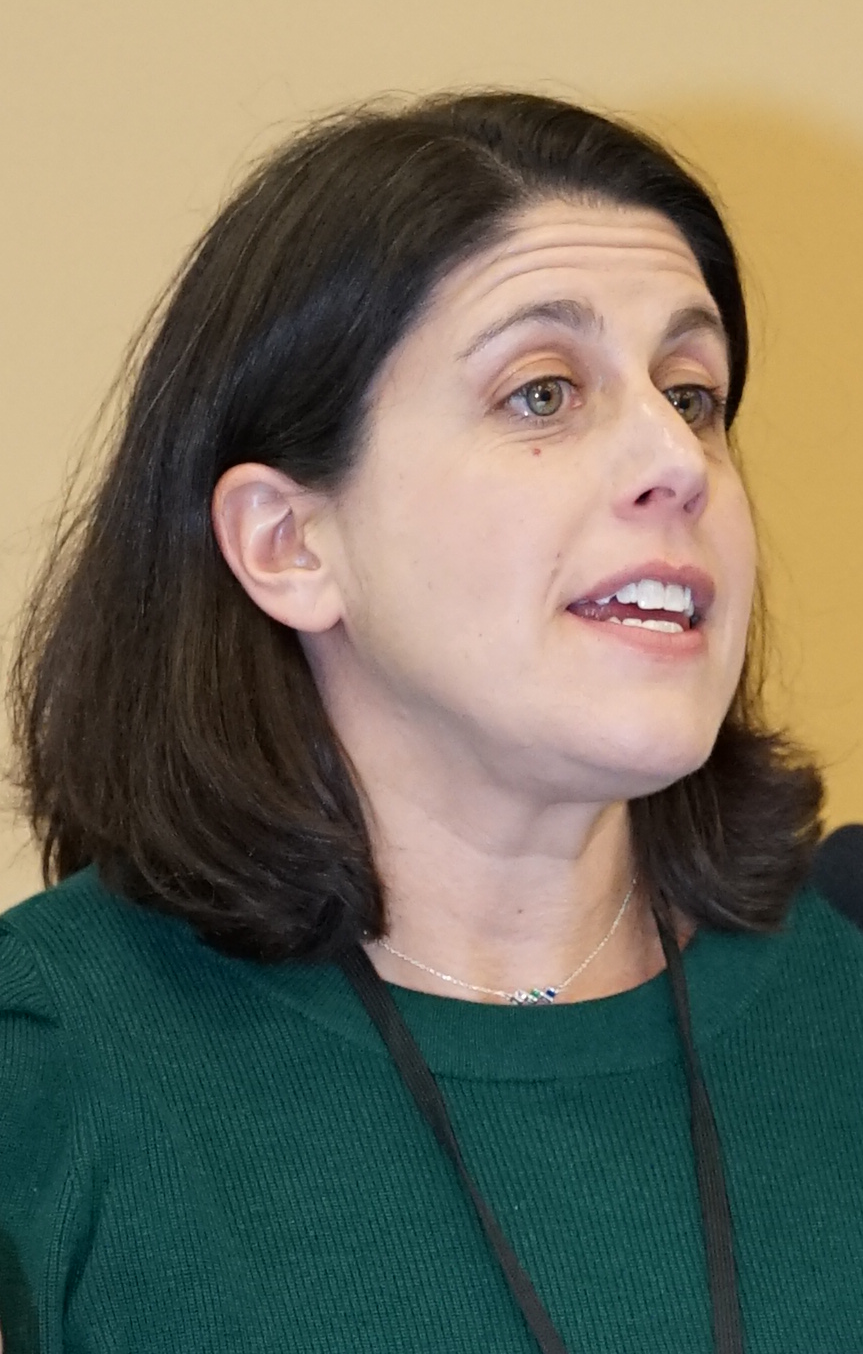
- Kahn at ASSA 2026
- Education: Harvard University (Ph.D. 2008); Harvard University (M.A. 2005); University of Chicago (A.B. 2003)
- Occupation: Professor of Economics
- Website: sites.google.com/site/lbkahn/

Lisa Blau Kahn is a professor of economics at the University of Rochester. Her research focuses on labor economics with interests in organization, education, and contract theory. From 2014 to 2018, she served as an associate professor of economics at Yale School of Management and as an assistant professor of economics at Yale School of Management from 2008 to 2014. From 2010 to 2011, Kahn served as the senior economist for labor and education policy on President Obama's Council of Economic Advisers.

Kahn received an A.B. in economics with honors from the University of Chicago in 2003. She received an M.A. in economics from Harvard University in 2005 and a Ph.D. in economics from Harvard University in 2008. Since 2018, she has served as an editor for the Journal of Human Resources, a leading journal in empirical microeconomics. Her work has been widely cited in both academic articles and in the press, including publications such as The Wall Street Journal, The Atlantic, Huffington Post, the Chicago Tribune, and others.

== Work and education ==
In 2003, Kahn received an A.B. in economics with honors from the University of Chicago. She received an M.A. and a Ph.D. in economics from Harvard University in 2005 and 2008. Afterwards, she became an assistant professor of economics at Yale School of Management, where she taught competitive strategy and the internal organization of the firm, the employee perspective, and "freakonomics". From 2010 to 2011, Kahn served as a senior economist for the Council of Economic Advisers, focused on labor and education policy. From 2011 to 2012, she was a visiting fellow at the Brookings Institution. She joined the IZA Institute of Labor Economics as a research fellow in November 2012. In 2014, she was promoted to associate professor of economics at the Yale School of Management.

Since 2014, she has served as a faculty research fellow at the National Bureau of Economic Studies in Labor Studies. From 2015 to 2016, she was a visiting research scholar in the industrial relations section of the department of economics at Princeton University. She also taught an undergraduate junior writing workshop at Princeton from 2015 to 2016.

In 2018, Kahn become a professor of economics at the University of Rochester. She teaches graduate labor economics and taught an undergraduate course titled "Freakonomics" in the spring of 2019.

== Works ==
- "Cyclical Job Ladders by Firm Size and Firm Wage" (with John Haltiwanger, Henry Hyatt, and Erika McEntarfer), American Economic Journal: Macroeconomics, 2018, 10(2): pp. 52–85.
- Hoffman, M., Kahn, L.B. and Li, D., 2017. "Discretion in hiring." The Quarterly Journal of Economics, 133(2), pp. 765–800.
- Hershbein, B. and Kahn, L.B., 2018. "Do recessions accelerate routine-biased technological change? Evidence from vacancy postings." American Economic Review, 108(7), pp. 1737–72.
- Deming, D. and Kahn, L.B., 2018. "Skill requirements across firms and labor markets: Evidence from job postings for professionals." Journal of Labor Economics, 36(S1), pp.S337-S369.
- Hershbein, Brad, and Lisa B. Kahn. 2017. "The Great Recession Drastically Changed the Skills Employers Want." Harvard Business Review, October 4.
- "Cashier or Consultant? Entry Labor Market Conditions, Field of Study and Career Success" (with Joseph Altonji and Jamin Speer), Journal of Labor Economics, 2016, 34(S1, part2): pp. S361-S401.
- "Employer Learning, Productivity and the Earnings Distribution: Evidence from Performance Measures" (with Fabian Lange), Review of Economic Studies, 2014, 81(4): pp. 1575–1613.
- "Trends in Earnings Differentials across College Majors and the Changing Task Composition of Jobs" (with Joseph Altonji and Jamin Speer), American Economic Review Papers and Proceedings, 2014, 104(5): pp. 387–93.
- "Asymmetric Information between Employers", American Economic Journal: Applied Economics, 2013, 5(4): pp. 165–205.
- Kahn, L.B., 2010. The long-term labor market consequences of graduating from college in a bad economy. Labour Economics, 17(2), pp. 303–316
- "The Plight of Mixed Race Adolescents" (with R.G Fyer Jr., S.D. Levitt, and J.L. Spenkuch), Review of Economics and Statistics, 94(3): pp. 621–634.

=== Working papers ===
- "Dropouts Need Not Apply: The Minimum Wage and Skill Upgrading" (with Jeffrey Clemens and Jonathan Meer), May 2019.
- "Incentivizing Learning-By-Doing: The Role of Compensation Schemes" (with Joshua S. Graff Zivin and Matthew Neidell), NBER Working Paper No. 25799, May 2019.
- "The Minimum Wage, Fringe Benefits, and Worker Welfare" (with Jeffrey Clemens and Jonathan Meer), NBER Working Paper No. 24635, May 2018. [Appendix—Response to Cengiz]
- "The Effect of Teen Pregnancy on Siblings' Sexual Behavior" (with Priyanka Anand), August 2018.

== Honors, scholarships, and fellowships ==
Year	Award	Institution
2010-11	Best paper in Labour Economics	Labour Economics
2007-08	Alan and Barbara Washkowitz Graduate Student Dissertation Fellowship	
2006-07	Thomas Cochran Dissertation Fellowship	Cochran Fellowship Program
2003-05	Harvard University Graduate Student Fellowship	Harvard University
