= Hans Kann =

Austrian pianist and composer (1927–2005)

Hans Kann (born 14 February 1927 in Vienna; died 24 June 2005) was an Austrian pianist and composer. He taught music in his native Austria and in Japanese schools such as the Tokyo National University of Fine Arts and Music.

He was the son of businessman Emil Kann and Karoline Kann.

== Awards ==
- 1961 and 1963 Körner foundation prize
- 1984 Nestroy Ring
- 1987 Austrian Cross of Honour for Science and Art, 1st class
- 1994 Medal of the Japanese Emperor
