= Köhnen =

Köhnen, or Kohnen, is a surname. Notable people with the surname include:

- Egon Köhnen (born 1947), German footballer
- Friederun Köhnen (1942–2026), German television chef and food industry executive
- Heinz Kohnen (1938–1997), German scientist and geophysicist
- Joseph Kohnen (1940–2015), Luxembourgish writer
- Julia Kohnen Griffey (born 1992), American marathon runner
- Natascha Kohnen (born 1967), German politician
- Ralph B. Kohnen (1935–2008), American politician

== See also ==
- Kohnen Station, German summer-only polar research station in the Antarctic
- Kuhn, Kühn, Kuehn, Kühne, Kuehne, Kühnen, Kuene, Kühnemann, Kuneman, Kühnel
- Coen, Koen, Koene, Koens, Köhn, Köhne, Koehne, Köhnen, Köhns
