= Kühnemann =

Kühnemann is a German surname.

Notable people with the surname include:

- Antje-Katrin Kühnemann (1945–2025), German doctor and television presenter
- Olaf Kühnemann (born 1972), Israeli-German painter
- Matthew Kuhnemann (born 1996), Australian cricketer
- Melanie Kühnemann-Grunow (born 1972), German politician

== See also ==
- Kuhn, Kühn, Kuehn, Kühne, Kuehne, Kühnen, Kuene, Kühnemann, Kuneman, Kühnel
- Coen, Koen, Koene, Koens, Köhn, Köhne, Koehne, Köhnen, Köhns
