= Kuhn =

Kuhn is a surname of German origin. It may refer to the following:

- Abraham Kuhn (banker) (1819–1892), German-American founder of Kuhn, Loeb & Co.
- Abraham Kuhn (otolarynologist) (1838–1900), Alsatian otolaryngologist
- Adam Kuhn (1741–1817), American naturalist and physicist
- Albert Kuhn (1860–1934), Washington state pioneer and businessman
- Alvin Boyd Kuhn (1880–1963), American scholar of mythology and linguistics
- Amy Kuhn, American politician
- Annette Kuhn, British author, cultural historian, and educator
- Anthony Kuhn, NPR correspondent in Beijing, China
- Bradley M. Kuhn (born 1973), American free software activist
- Bowie Kuhn (1926–2007), American baseball commissioner
- Charles Kuhn (1892–1989), cartoonist
- Charles L. Kuhn (1902-1985), American academic and art historian
- Deanna Kuhn (born 1944), professor of psychology
- Franz Kuhn (1884–1961), German lawyer and translator of Chinese novels
- Franz Felix Adalbert Kuhn (1812–1881), German philologist and folklorist
- Frédéric Kuhn (born 1968), French hammer thrower
- Friedrich Adalbert Maximilian Kuhn (1842–1894), German botanist
- Fritz Kuhn (born 1955), German Green Party politician
- Fritz Julius Kuhn (1896–1951), leader of the German American Bund
- Hans Kuhn (philologist) (1899-1988), German philologist
- Hans Kuhn (chemist) (1919-2012), Swiss chemist
- Harold W. Kuhn (1925–2014), American mathematician, John von Neumann Theory Prize winner, developer of Kuhn poker
- Heino Kuhn (born 1984), South African cricketer
- Ida Soule Kuhn (1869–1952), American political and social activist
- Jeff Kuhn, physicist and astronomer
- Johannes von Kuhn (1806–1887), German Catholic theologian
- Joseph Kuhn-Régnier (1873–1940), French illustrator
- John Kuhn (born 1982), American football player
- Judy Kuhn (born 1958), American singer and actress, Tony Award winner
- Kaila Kuhn (born 2003), American freestyle skier
- Keegan Kuhn, American documentary filmmaker, director, producer, and professional musician
- Köbi Kuhn (1943–2019), Swiss football coach
- Maggie Kuhn (1905–1995), American activist, founder of the Gray Panthers
- Markus Kuhn (American football) (born 1986), German-born American football player
- Markus Kuhn (computer scientist) (born 1971), German computer scientist
- Mickey Kuhn (1932–2022), American child actor
- Niklaus Kuhn (1934–2026), Swiss architect and politician
- Oliver Kuhn (1898–1968), "Doc Kuhn", American football, baseball and basketball player
- Oskar Kuhn (1908–1990), German paleontologist
- Philip A. Kuhn (1933–2016), Harvard professor and China expert
- Paul Kuhn (disambiguation), several people
- Peter Kuhn (1955–2009), American race car driver
- Richard Kuhn (1900–1967), Austrian biochemist, 1938 Nobel Prize in Chemistry
- Rick Kuhn (born 1955), Australian Marxist economist and lecturer
- Robert Lawrence Kuhn (born 1944), American author, investment banker, China specialist and PBS TV documentary host
- Robert Verrill Kuhn (known as Bob Keane, 1922–2009), American clarinetist, producer and label owner
- Roland Kuhn, Swiss psychiatrist
- Simone Kuhn (born 1980), Swiss beach volleyball player
- Steve Kuhn (born 1938), American jazz pianist
- Thomas Kuhn (1922–1996), American philosopher and historian of science, author of The Structure of Scientific Revolutions
- Walt Kuhn (1877–1949), American painter

Kihn (variant)

- Greg Kihn, American musician and novelist
- Martin Kihn, American writer and digital marketer
- W. Langdon Kihn (1898–1957), American painter and illustrator

== See also ==
- Kühn, disambiguation
- Kuhn Island, an island of Greenland
- Kuhn (.hack), a fictional character in the .hack franchise
- Kuhn, Loeb & Co., an American investment bank
- KUHN, a Louisiana-based radio station
- Kuhn, Kühn, Kuehn, Kühne, Kuehne, Kühnen, Kühnemann, Kuneman, Kühnel
- Coen, Koen, Koene, Koens, Köhn, Köhne, Koehne, Köhnen, Köhns
