= Kuneman =

Kuneman is a Dutch surname. Notable people with the surname include:

- Jampie Kuneman, (1923–2018), Dutch football player
- Harry Kuneman (1886–1945), Dutch football player

== See also ==
- Kuhn, Kühn, Kuehn, Kühne, Kuehne, Kühnen, Kuene, Kühnemann, Kuneman, Kühnel
- Coen, Koen, Koene, Koens, Köhn, Köhne, Koehne, Köhnen, Köhns
