= Koene =

Koene is a surname. Notable people with the surname include:

- Francis Koene (1899–1935), Dutch violinist
- Isaac Koene (1637–1713), Dutch Golden Age painter
- Randal A. Koene (fl. early 21st century), Dutch neuroscientist and neuroengineer
- Simon Koene (born 1946), Dutch artist
- Sittah Koene (born 1969), Dutch illusionist

== See also ==
- Kuhn, Kühn, Kuehn, Kühne, Kuehne, Kühnen, Kuene, Kühnemann, Kuneman, Kühnel
- Coen, Koen, Koene, Koens, Köhn, Köhne, Koehne, Köhnen, Köhns
