= Kühn (surname) =

Kühn is a surname of German origin, derived from the Old German name Conrad. It may refer to one of the following people:

- Anke Kühne née Kühn (b. 1981), German hockey player
- Axel Kühn (b. 1967), German bobsledder
- Christian Kühn (b. 1979), German politician
- Daniela Kühn (b. 1973), German mathematician
- Dieter Kühn (b. 1956), German footballer
- Enrico Kühn (b. 1977), German bobsledder
- Friedrich Kühn (general) (1889–1944), German army armor general
- Gabriele Kühn (b. 1957), German rower
- Gerd Kühn (b. 1968), German footballer
- Heinrich Kühn (1866–1944), Austrian Photographer
- Heinz Kühn (1912–1992), German politician
- Joachim Kühn (b. 1944), German jazz pianist
- Johannes Kühn, (born 1991), German biathlete
- Johannes Kühn (writer) (1934–2023), German writer
- Jörg Kühn (1940–1964), Swiss artist
- Julius Kühn (1825–1910), German academic and agronomist
- Michael Kühn (b. 1963), German footballer
- Othmar Kühn (1892–1969), Austrian paleontologist and geologist
- Philipp Kühn (born 1992), German footballer
- Rolf Kühn (1929–2022), German jazz clarinetist and saxophonist
- Sophie von Kühn (1782–1797), fiancée of the German Romantic poet and philosopher Novalis
- Stephan Kühn (born 1979), German politician
- Susanne Kühn (born 1969), German artist
- Volkmar Kühn (born 1942), German artist
- Wolfram Kühn (b. 1952), German Navy Vice Admiral

== See also ==
- Kuhn, Kühn, Kuehn, Kühne, Kuehne, Kühnen, Kuene, Kühnemann, Kuneman, Kühnel
- Coen, Koen, Koene, Koens, Köhn, Köhne, Koehne, Köhnen, Köhns
