= Kühnen =

Kühnen is a surname. Notable people with the surname include:

- Dirk Kuhnen
- Michael Kühnen (1955–1991), German neo-Nazi activist
- Patrik Kühnen (born 1966), German tennis player
- Peter Ludwig Kühnen
- Uta Kühnen (born 1975), German judoka

== See also ==
- Kuhn, Kühn, Kuehn, Kühne, Kuehne, Kühnen, Kuene, Kühnemann, Kuneman, Kühnel
- Coen, Koen, Koene, Koens, Köhn, Köhne, Koehne, Köhnen, Köhns
