= Kühnel =

Kühnel is a surname. Notable people with the surname include:

- August Kühnel (1645–c. 1700), German composer and viola da gamba performer
- Ambrosius Kühnel (1771-1813), German organist and music publisher
- Ernst Kühnel (1882−1964), German art historian
- Kea Kühnel (born 1991), German freestyle skier
- Mariana Harder-Kühnel (born 1974), German politician
- Rudolf Kühnel (1896–1950), Austrian racewalker

== See also ==
- Kuhn, Kühn, Kuehn, Kühne, Kuehne, Kühnen, Kuene, Kühnemann, Kuneman, Kühnel
- Coen, Koen, Koene, Koens, Köhn, Köhne, Koehne, Köhnen, Köhns
