= Kühne =

Kühne is a surname. Notable people with the surname include:

- Alfred Kühne (1895–1981), German businessman
- Alfred von Kühne (1853–1945), Prussian general
- Anke Kühne (born 1981), German field hockey player
- August Kühne (1855–1932), German businessman
- Bill Kuehne (1858–1921), American baseball player
- Bruno Kuehne, Austrian para-alpine skier and cyclist
- Dafi Kühne (born 1982), Swiss graphic designer
- Eric Kuhne (1951–2016), American-born British architect
- Frank Kühne (born 1961), German swimmer
- Friedi Kühne (born 1989), German slackliner
- Friedrich Kühne (1870–1959), German actor
- Hank Kuehne (born 1975), American professional golfer
- Hans Kühne (1880–1969), German chemist and businessman
- Helmut Kuhne (born 1949), German politician
- Hugo Kuehne (1884–1963), American architect and city planner
- Kelli Kuehne (born 1977), American professional golfer
- Klaus-Michael Kühne (1937-2026), German billionaire and businessman
- Louis Kuhne (1835–1901), German naturopath
- Lukas Kühne, German sound sculptor
- Marc Kühne (born 1976), German bobsledder
- Matthias Kühne (born 1987), German footballer
- Michael Kühne (born 1971), German diver
- Nieke Kühne (born 2004), German handball player
- Otto Kühne (1893–1955), German politician
- Ramona Kühne (born 1980), German boxer
- Rita Kühne (born 1947), East German sprinter
- Roy Kühne (born 1967), German politician
- Simon Kühne (born 1994), Liechtenstein footballer
- Stefan Kühne (born 1980), German footballer and coach
- Thomas Kühne (born 1958), German historian
- Tobias Kühne (born 1977), German rower
- Trip Kuehne (born 1972), American amateur golfer
- Viktor Kühne (1857–1945), German officer
- Walter Georg Kühne (1911–1991), German paleontologist
- Wilhelm Kühne (1837–1900), German physiologist
- Wilhelm Kühne (aviator) (1888–1918), German flying ace
- Wilhelm Otto Kühne (1924–1988), South African writer

== See also ==
- Kuhn, Kühn, Kuehn, Kühne, Kuehne, Kühnen, Kühnemann, Kuneman, Kühnel
- Coen, Koen, Koene, Koens, Köhn, Köhne, Koehne, Köhnen, Köhns
