= Koenen =

Koenen (High German pronunciation: [ˈkøːnə(n)], Dutch pronunciation: [ˈkunə(n)]) is a patronymic surname of Low German or Dutch origin derived from the given name Koen (Conrad).

Notable people with the surname include:

- Adolf von Koenen (1837–1915), German geologist
- Bernard Koenen (1889–1964), Communist and East German politician
- Breanna Koenen (born 1994), Australian rules footballer
- Emmy Damerius-Koenen (1903–1987), East German politician
- Gerd Koenen (born 1944), German historian and former communist
- Heinrich Koenen (1910–1945), German anti-fascist fighter and Soviet agent
- Joannes Henricus Maria Koenen (1893–1956), Dutch neurologist who described Koenen's tumor
- Karestan Koenen (born 1968), American epidemiologist
- Ludwig Koenen (1931–2023), German-born American philologist and papyrologist
- Lyle Koenen (born 1956), American politician in Minnesota
- Mathias Koenen (1849–1924), German civil engineer
- Michael Koenen (born 1982), American football player
- Theo Koenen (1890–1964), German footballer
- Vera Koenen (born 1967), Dutch volleyball player
- Wilhelm Koenen (1886–1963), Communist and East German politician

Koene

- Isaac Koene (1637–1713), Dutch landscape painter
- Randal A. Koene (born 1971), Dutch neuroscientist

== See also ==
- Coenen
- Koenders
