= Khuen =

Khuen (or Khün) may refer to:

- Khuen people, an aboriginal ethnic group of Laos, or their language
- Khün language (or Tai Khün), a language of Burma
- Dok Khuen
- Khmuic languages (Khmu’, Khuen)
- Kuan (disambiguation)
- Khün Khürtü, a music group from Tuva
- Khuen von Belasi, an Austrian noble family of the county of Tyrol
  - Johannes Khuen (1606 - 1675)
  - Count Károly Khuen-Héderváry

== See also ==
- Kühn (disambiguation)
- Kuhn
