= Kuehn (surname) =

Kuehn is a German surname, a spelling variant of Kühn.

- Kuehn family, a family of WWII German spies
- Andrew J. Kuehn
- Art Kuehn
- Athena Kuehn
- Brenda Corrie-Kuehn
- Charles Kuehn
- Cherami Leigh Kuehn
- Dana Kuehn
- F. C. W. Kuehn, Frank Charles William Kuehn
- Ferdinand Kuehn
- Gary Kuehn
- Greg Kuehn
- John Kuehn
- Louis Kuehn
- Michel Joseph Kuehn
- Manfred Kuehn
- Rachel Kuehn
- Stephanie Kuehn
- William Kuehn

== See also ==
- Kuhn, Kühn, Kuehn, Kühne, Kuehne, Kühnen, Kuene, Kühnemann, Kuneman, Kühnel
- Koene Köhn, Köhne, Koehne, Köhnen, Köhns, Kön, Köne, Könen, Könes
