= Kühn =

Kühn is a German word meaning "bold" and may refer to:

- Kühn (surname), a family name
- a nickname for rulers and generals
  - Karl der Kühne (1433–1477), (Charles the Bold)
  - Philipp der Kühne (1342–1404), (Philip the Bold)
- Kühn (Lower Bavaria), a village in the county of Freyung-Grafenau in Lower Bavaria

Kühn is part of the following names:

- Kühndorf, a village in the district of Schmalkalden-Meiningen in Germany
- Wendt & Kühn, a manufacturer of Ore Mountain wooden figures and music boxes
- Karosseriewerke Otto Kühn, a former company from Halle (Saale), Germany
- Kühn & Kollegen, a TV programme
- Clemens Kühn, German music theorist
- Kühn Controls AG, German Company

== See also ==
- Kuhn, a surname
- Kühne
