= Toleration =

Allowing or permitting something that one disapproves

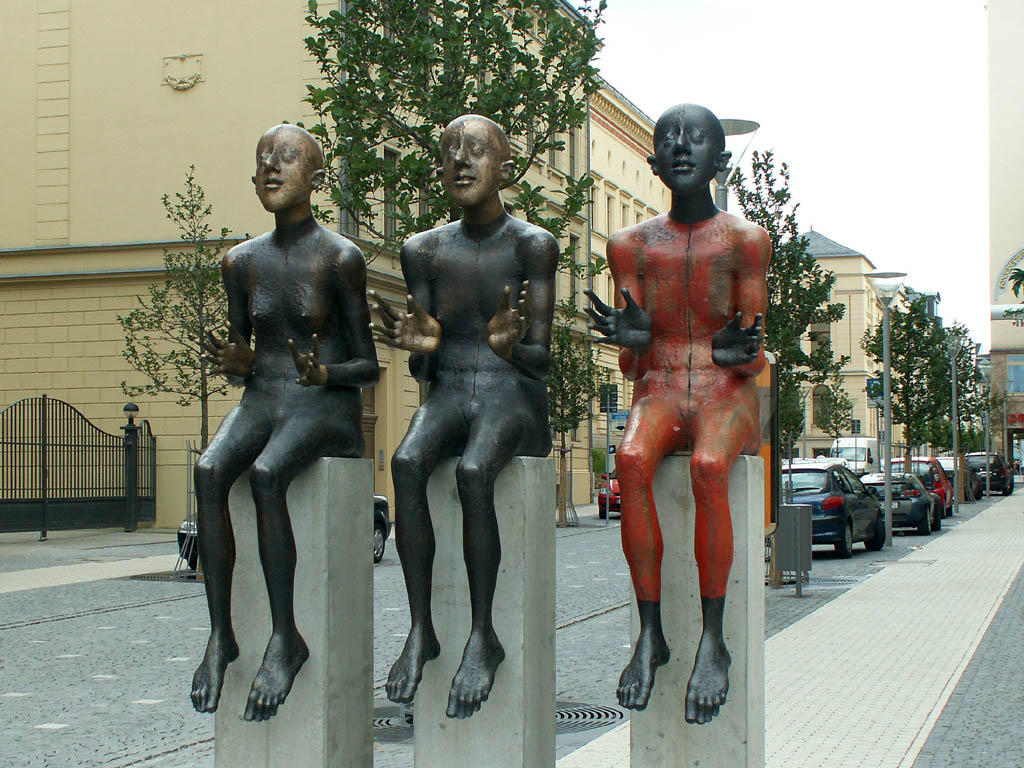
Sculpture Für Toleranz ("for tolerance") by Volkmar Kühn, Gera, Germany

Toleration is the act of permitting an action, idea, object, or person that one dislikes or disagrees with. Political scientist Andrew R. Murphy explains that "We can improve our understanding by defining 'toleration' as a set of social or political practices and 'tolerance' as a set of attitudes." Random House Dictionary defines tolerance as "a fair, objective, and permissive attitude toward those whose opinions, beliefs, practices, racial or ethnic origins, etc., differ from one's own". The Merriam-Webster Dictionary associates toleration both with "putting up with" something undesirable, and with neglect or failure to prevent or alleviate it.

Both these concepts contain the idea of alterity: the state of otherness. Additional choices of how to respond to the "other", beyond toleration, exist. Therefore, in some instances, toleration has been seen as "a flawed virtue" because it concerns acceptance of things that were better overcome. Toleration cannot, therefore, be defined as a universal good, and many of its applications and uses remain contested.

Religious toleration may signify "no more than forbearance and the permission given by the adherents of a dominant religion for other religions to exist, even though the latter are looked on with disapproval as inferior, mistaken, or harmful". Historically, most incidents and writings pertaining to religious toleration involve the status of minority and dissenting viewpoints in relation to a dominant state religion; however, religion is also sociological, and the practice of toleration has always had a political aspect as well.

Toleration assumes a conflict over something important that cannot be resolved through normal negotiation without resorting to war or violence. As political lecturer Catriona McKinnon explains, when it comes to questions like what is "the best way to live, the right things to think, the ideal political society, or the true road to salvation, no amount of negotiation and bargaining will bring them to an agreement without at least one party relinquishing the commitments that created the conflict in the first place. Such conflicts provide the circumstances of toleration... [and] are endemic in society." "The urgency and relevance of this issue is only too obvious: without tolerance, communities that value diversity, equality, and peace could not persist."

An examination of the history of toleration includes its practice across various cultures. Toleration has evolved into a guiding principle, finding contemporary relevance in politics, society, religion, and ethnicity. It also applies to minority groups, including LGBT individuals. It is closely linked to concepts like human rights.

== Etymology ==
Originally from the Latin tolerans (present participle of tolerare; "to bear, endure, tolerate"), the word tolerance was first used in Middle French in the 14th century and in Early Modern English in the early 15th century. Toleration was first used in English in the 1510s to mean "permission granted by authority, licence" from the French tolération (originally from the Latin past participle stem of tolerare, tolerationem), moving towards the meaning of "forbearance, sufferance" in the 1580s. The notion of religious toleration stems from Sebastian Castellio, as well as the Toleration Act 1688.

== France ==
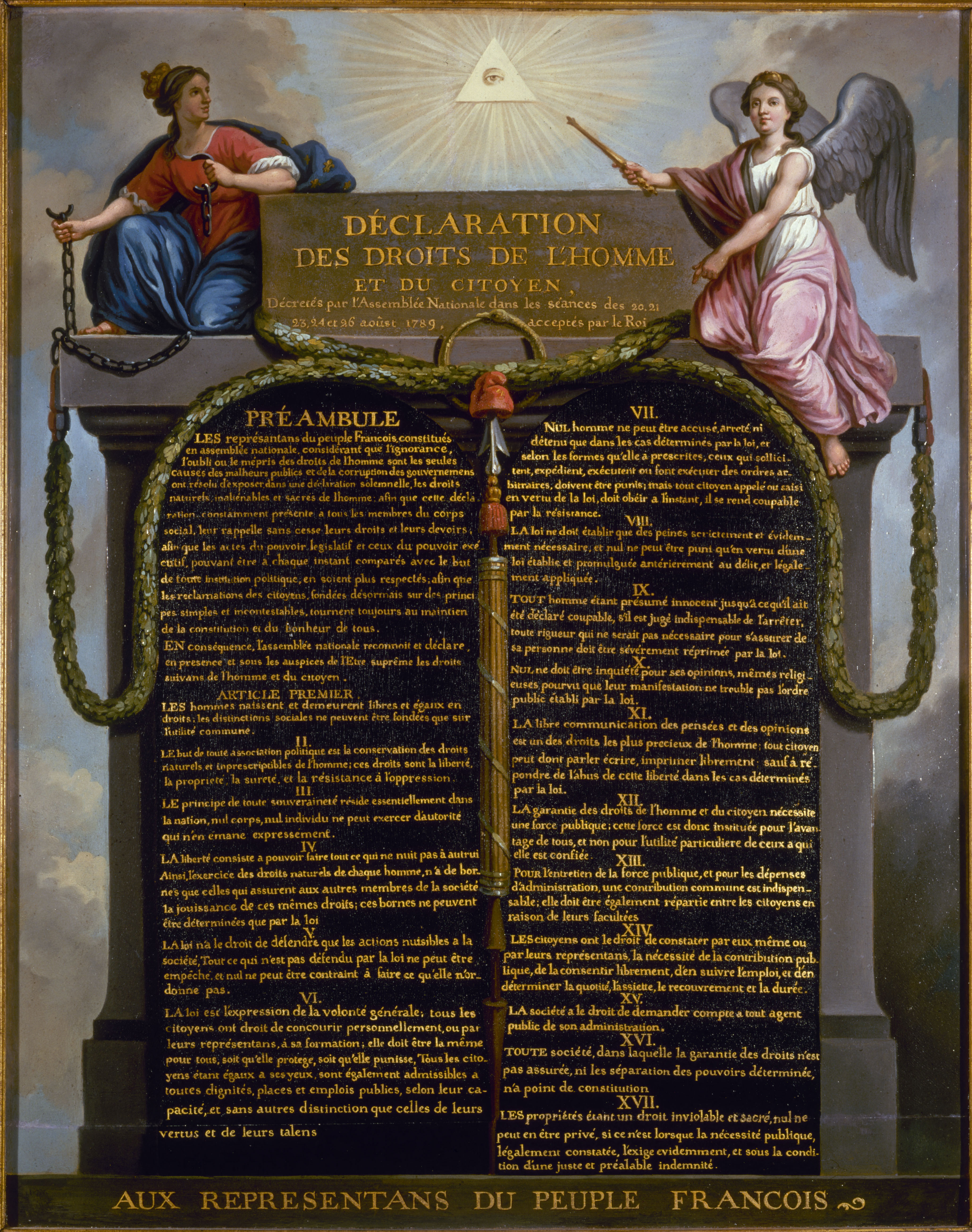
Declaration of the Rights of Man and of the Citizen

For having lived long, I have experienced many instances of being obliged, by better information or fuller consideration, to change opinions even on important subjects, which I once thought right but found to be otherwise. It is, therefore, that the older I grow, the more apt I am to doubt my judgment and to pay more respect to the judgment of others.

— Benjamin Franklin

The Declaration of the Rights of Man and of the Citizen (1789), adopted by the National Constituent Assembly during the French Revolution, states in Article 10: "No-one shall be interfered with for his opinions, even religious ones, provided that their practice does not disturb public order as established by the law." ("Nul ne doit être inquiété pour ses opinions, mêmes religieuses, pourvu que leur manifestation ne trouble pas l'ordre public établi par la loi.")

== In the 19th century ==
=== John Stuart Mill ===
In "On Liberty" (1859) John Stuart Mill states that opinions ought never to be suppressed, stating, "Such prejudice, or oversight, when it [i.e. false belief] occurs, is altogether an evil; but it is one from which we cannot hope to be always exempt, and must be regarded as the price paid for an inestimable good." He claims that there are three sorts of beliefs that can be had—wholly false, partly true, and wholly true—all of which, according to Mill, benefit the common good:

First, if any opinion is compelled to silence, that opinion may, for aught we can certainly know, be true. To deny this is to assume our infallibility. Secondly, though the silenced opinion is an error, it may, and very commonly does, contain a portion of truth; and since the general or prevailing opinion on any subject is rarely or never the whole truth, it is only by the collision of adverse opinions that the remainder of the truth has any chance of being supplied. Thirdly, even if the received opinion is not only true but the whole truth; unless it is suffered to be, and is, vigorously and earnestly contested, it will, by most of those who receive it, be held in the manner of a prejudice, with little comprehension or feeling of its rational grounds. Not only this, but, fourthly, the meaning of the doctrine itself will be in danger of being lost, or enfeebled, and deprived of its vital effect on the character and conduct: the dogma becoming a mere formal profession, inefficacious for good, but cumbering the ground, and preventing the growth of any real and heartfelt conviction, from reason or personal experience.

=== Ernest Renan ===
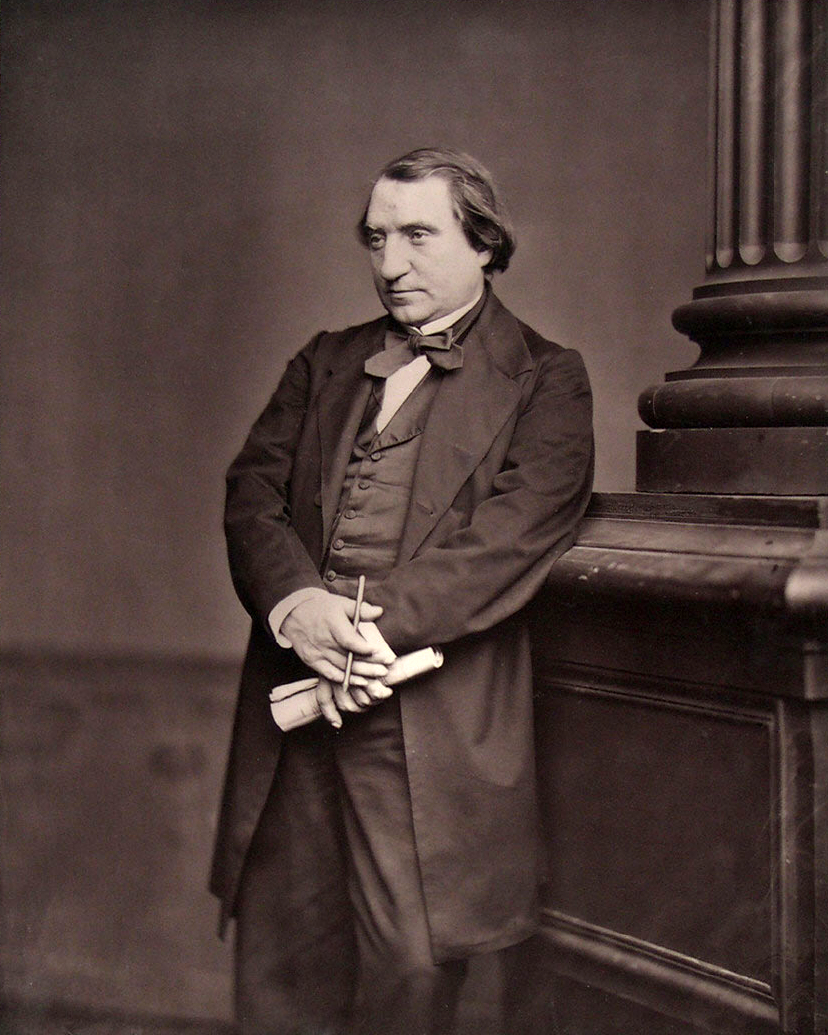
Ernest Renan, 1876–1884

In his 1882 essay "What is a Nation?", French historian and philosopher Ernest Renan proposed a definition of nationhood based on "a spiritual principle" involving shared memories rather than a common religious, racial, or linguistic heritage. Thus members of any religious group could participate fully in the nation's life. "You can be French, English, German, yet Catholic, Protestant, Jewish, or practicing no religion."

== In the 20th century ==
In 1948, the United Nations General Assembly adopted Article 18 of the Universal Declaration of Human Rights, which states:

Everyone has the right to freedom of thought, conscience, and religion; this right includes freedom to change his religion or belief and freedom, either alone or in community with others and in public or private, to manifest his religion or belief in teaching, practice, worship, and observance.

Though not formally legally binding, the Declaration has been adopted in or has influenced many national constitutions since 1948. It also serves as the foundation for a growing number of international treaties and national laws and international, regional, national, and sub-national institutions protecting and promoting human rights, including the freedom of religion.

== Modern analyses and critiques ==
Contemporary commentators have highlighted situations in which toleration conflicts with widely held moral standards, national law, the principles of national identity, or other strongly held goals. Michael Walzer notes that the British in India tolerated the Hindu practice of suttee (ritual burning of a widow) until 1829. On the other hand, the United States declined to tolerate the Mormon practice of polygamy. The French head scarf controversy represents a conflict between religious practice and the French secular ideal. Toleration of or intolerance toward the Romani people in European countries is a continuing issue. Pope Francis refers to the "admirable creativity and generosity" shown by people who put up with their lives in "a seemingly undesirable environment" and learn "to live their lives amid disorder and uncertainty".

=== Modern definition ===
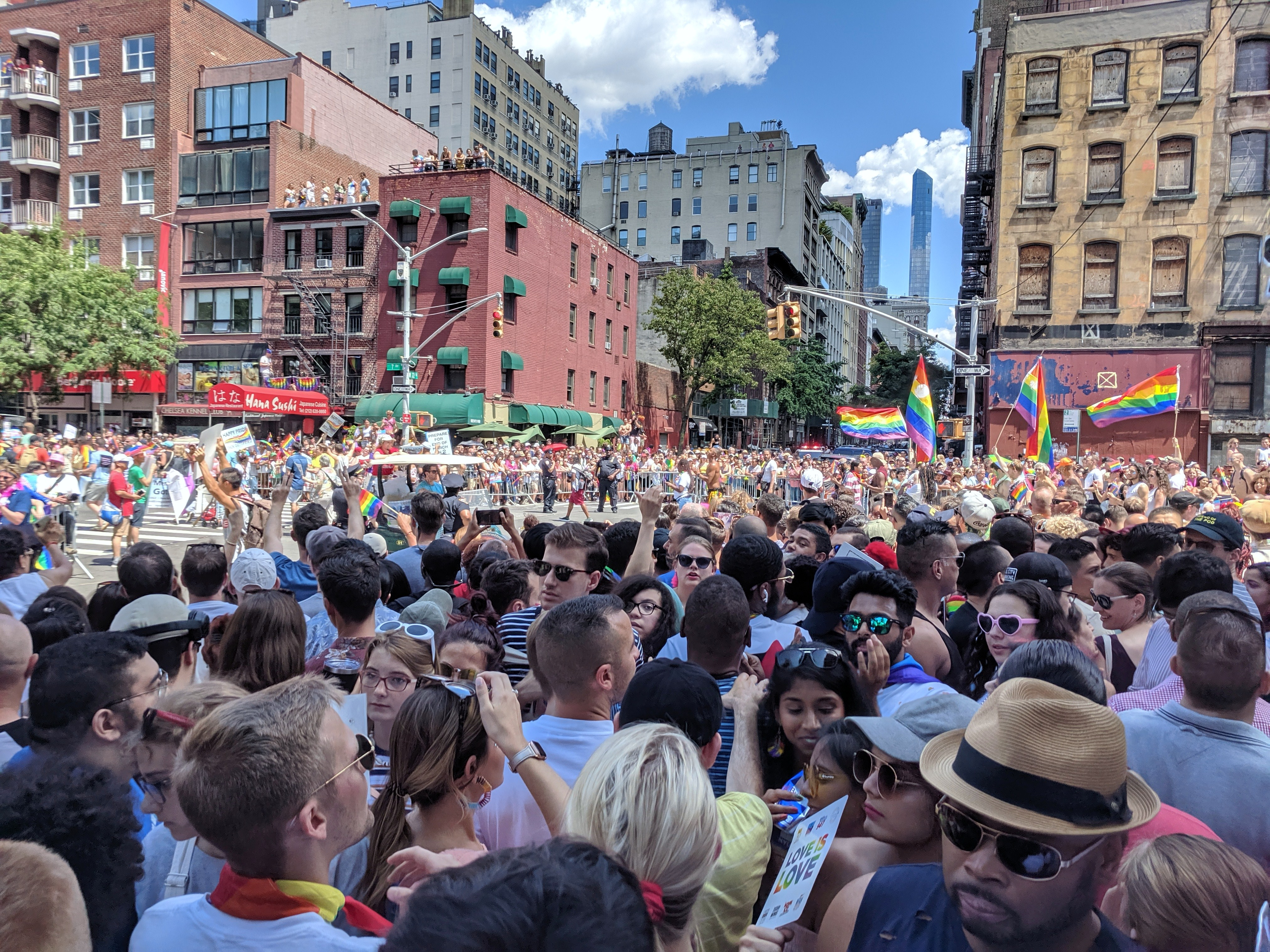
The NYC Pride March is the world's largest LGBT event. Regional variation exists with respect to toleration in different parts of the world.

Historian Alexandra Walsham observes that the modern understanding of toleration may be very different from its historic meaning. Toleration in modern parlance has been analyzed as a component of a liberal or libertarian view of human rights. Hans Oberdiek writes, "As long as no one is harmed or no one's fundamental rights are violated, the state should keep hands off, tolerating what those controlling the state find disgusting, deplorable, or debased. For a long time, this has been the most prevalent defense of toleration by liberals... It is found, for example, in the writings of American philosophers John Rawls, Robert Nozick, Ronald Dworkin, Brian Barry, and a Canadian, Will Kymlicka, among others."

Isaiah Berlin attributed to Herbert Butterfield the notion that "toleration ... implies a certain disrespect. I tolerate your absurd beliefs and your foolish acts, though I know them to be absurd and foolish. Mill would, I think, have agreed." John Gray states that "When we tolerate a practice, a belief or a character trait, we let something be that we judge to be undesirable, false, or at least inferior; our toleration expresses the conviction that, despite its badness, the object of toleration should be left alone." However, according to Gray, "new liberalism – the liberalism of Rawls, Dworkin, Ackerman and suchlike" – seems to imply that "it is wrong for government to discriminate in favour of, or against, any form of life animated by a definite conception of the good".

John Rawls' "theory of 'political liberalism' conceives of toleration as a pragmatic response to the fact of diversity". Diverse groups learn to tolerate one another by developing "what Rawls calls 'overlapping consensus': individuals and groups with diverse metaphysical views or 'comprehensive schemes' will find reasons to agree about certain principles of justice that will include principles of toleration". Herbert Marcuse, in the 1965 book A Critique of Pure Tolerance, argued that "pure tolerance" that permits all can favor totalitarianism and tyranny of the majority, and insisted on "repressive tolerance" against them.

=== Tolerating the intolerant ===
Several philosophers, such as Michael Walzer, Karl Popper, and John Rawls, have discussed the paradox of tolerating intolerance. Walzer asks "Should we tolerate the intolerant?" He notes that most minority religious groups who are the beneficiaries of tolerance are themselves intolerant, at least in some respects. Rawls argues that an intolerant sect should be tolerated in a tolerant society unless the sect directly threatens the security of other members of the society. He hypothetises that members of the intolerant sect in a tolerant society will, over time, acquire the tolerance of the wider society.

=== Other criticisms and issues ===
Toleration has been described as undermining itself via moral relativism: "either the claim self-referentially undermines itself or it provides us with no compelling reason to believe it. If we are skeptical about knowledge, then we have no way of knowing that toleration is good."

Ronald Dworkin argues that in exchange for toleration, minorities must bear with the criticisms and insults which are part of the freedom of speech in an otherwise tolerant society. Dworkin has also questioned whether the United States is a "tolerant secular" nation, or is re-characterizing itself as a "tolerant religious" nation, based on the increasing re-introduction of religious themes into conservative politics. Dworkin concludes that "the tolerant secular model is preferable, although he invited people to use the concept of personal responsibility to argue in favor of the tolerant religious model."

In The End of Faith, Sam Harris asserts that society should be unwilling to tolerate unjustified religious beliefs about morality, spirituality, politics, and the origin of humanity, especially beliefs that promote violence.

== See also ==
- A Critique of Pure Tolerance
- Anekantavada
- International Day for Tolerance
- Religious discrimination
- Religious intolerance
- Religious liberty
- Religious persecution
- Religious pluralism
- The Death Camp of Tolerance
- Zero tolerance
- Paradox of Tolerance

== Sources ==
This article incorporates text from a free content work. Licensed under CC-BY-SA IGO 3.0 (license statement/permission). Text taken from Rethinking Education: Towards a global common good?, 24, UNESCO.
