= Olthuis =

Olthuis is a Dutch surname. Notable people with the surname include:

- James Olthuis, philosopher
- Kees Olthuis (1940-2019), Dutch composer
- Koen Olthuis, architect and designer of the Amphibious House
- Marja-Liisa Olthuis (born 1967), Inari Sámi researcher, author and language activist
