= Coenen =

Dutch patronymic surname

Coenen /ˈkunən/ is a Dutch patronymic surname meaning "son of Coen" (Conrad). It is particularly common in Dutch and Belgian Limburg. Variant spellings are Coene, Koenen and Koene. Though probably with the same origin, the names "de Coene" and "de Koene" can be interpreted as meaning "the brave".

People with this surname include:

- Adriaen Coenen (1514–1587), Dutch fisherman and amateur biologist
- Annemie Coenen (born 1978), Belgian singer, producer and composer
- Davy Coenen (1980–2010), Belgian mountain biker
- Dan Coenen, American legal scholar
- Dennis Coenen (born 1991), Belgian road bicycle racer
- Frans Coenen(1826–1904), Dutch composer and violinist
- Jo Coenen (born 1949), Dutch architect and urban planner
- Johan Coenen (born 1979), Belgian road bicycle racer
- Laura Coenen (born 1962), American handball player
- Marcel Coenen (born 1972), Dutch rock guitarist
- Marloes Coenen (born 1981), Dutch mixed martial artist
- Nathan Coenen (born 1992), Australian actor

Coene

- Constantinus Fidelio Coene (1780–1841), Flemish painter
- Eline Coene (born 1964), Dutch badminton player
- Jacques Coene (died 1411), Flemish painter, illustrator, and architect
- Jan Coene (born 1957), Belgian businessman
- Luc Coene (1947–2017), Belgian economist

De Coene

- Jean Henri De Coene (1798–1866), Belgian painter

== See also ==
- Koenen/Koene, surname
- Koen, surname and given name
- Coen (name), surname and given name
