= Koenraad =

Koenraad is a Dutch given name. Notable persons with that name include:

- Koenraad Degroote (born 1959), Belgian politician
- Koenraad Dillen (born 1964), Belgian politician
- Koenraad Elst (born 1959), Belgian orientalist and Indologist
- Koenraad Logghe (born 1963), Belgian neopagan
- Koenraad Wolter Swart (1916–1992), Dutch-American historian

== See also ==
- Coenraad
- Koen
- Conrad (name)
