= Olaf Kühnemann =

Israeli-German painter (born 1972)

Olaf Kühnemann (Hebrew: אולף קיונהמן; born 24 November 1972) is an Israeli-German painter, winner of the Isracard and Tel Aviv Museum of Art Prize of 2008 and was included in the juror's pick of the 2014 Thames & Hudson publishing's book, "100 Painters of Tomorrow". Since 2021 he is Co-Founder and Creative Director at Laba Berlin artist Fellowship program. Kühnemann lives and works between Berlin and Tel Aviv.

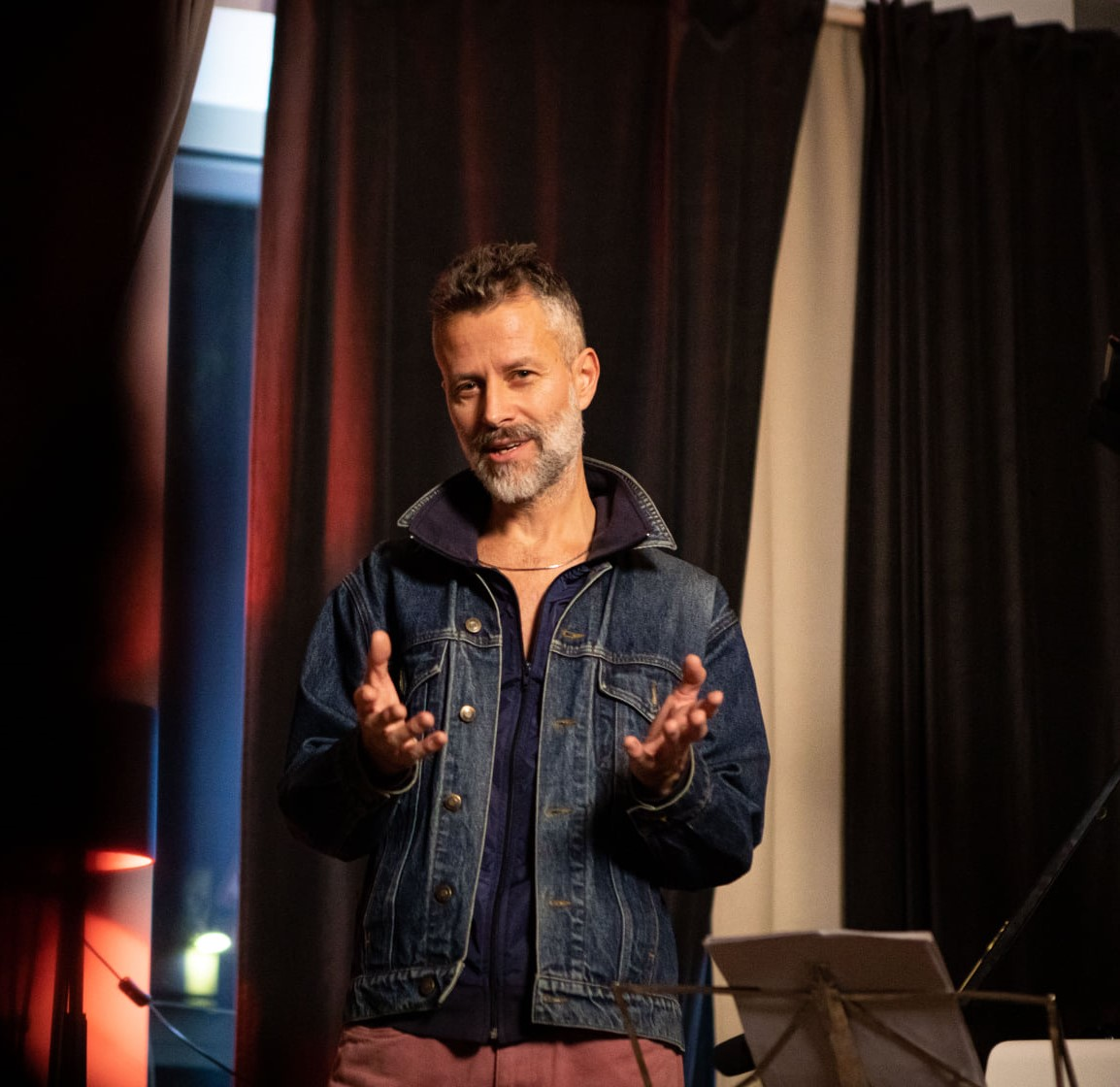
Olaf Kühnemann, 2021, photo: Boaz Arad

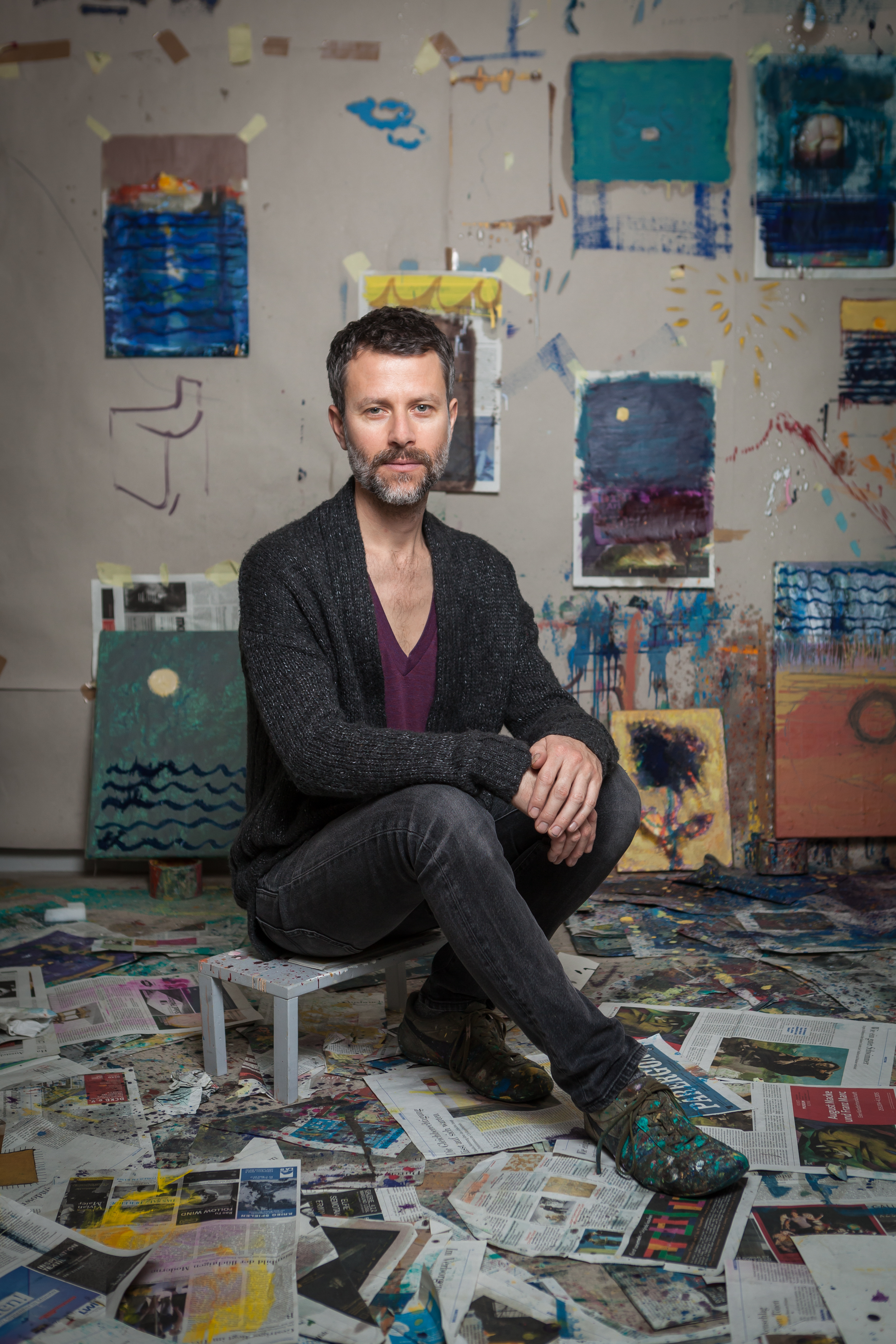
Olaf Kühnemann, 2015, photo: Boaz Arad

== Personal life and education ==
Olaf Kühnemann was born in Basel, Switzerland, in 1972 to German parents Markus and Christiane. Until the age of four, he was raised in Arlesheim, Basel, in a family that was greatly affected by Anthroposophy – on which the belief and occupation of both of his parents were based. Following the divorce of his parents and the second marriage of his mother to the Israeli professor Shimon Levi, the family moved to Montreal, Canada, in 1977, and to Herzliya, Israel, in 1980.

In Herzliya, Israel, Olaf met his first art teacher, the sculptor Zvi Lachman. During his childhood and early adulthood he studied painting with Lachman, and over the years became an apprentice in his studio. During 1987–1988 Kühnemann studied for a year at the Anthroposophical high school Michael Hall in East Sussex England, after which he returned to Israel. At the age of 18, he moved to New York. Upon his arrival he first studied privately with the painter David Paulson, after which he continued to the New York Studio School of Drawing, Painting and Sculpture (1990–1992), under the guidance of Rosemarie Beck, Ruth Miller and Bruce Gagnier, among others. Upon graduating from New York Studio School, Kühnemann started his master's degree at the Parsons School of Design (1992–1994), where he completed his MFA under the guidance of Glen Goldberg, Bruce Gagnier and Esteban Vicente, among others.

In 1994 he returned to Israel and joined the Givon Art Gallery as a gallery assistant. There, he spent eight years working alongside Israeli artists like Moshe Gershuni, Micha Ullman, Yair Garbuz, Uri Katzenstein, Raffi Lavie and others, were important and meaningful to his integration into Israeli art.

Kühnemann is married to Tal Alon, founder and Editor of Spitz Magazine, the first Hebrew magazine in Berlin and Germany since the holocaust, and is a father of two sons.

== 2000–2009: Painting family photographs ==
Kühnemann's work between 2000 and 2009 was based on observations of family photographs from the different stages of his and his family's lives (Germany, Switzerland, Canada, Israel, The Netherlands, The United States).

Main exhibitions during that period included Family Papers (It's Me: Auto/Biography), 2005, at the Herzliya Museum of Contemporary Art; Homescapes, 2007, at The Heder Gallery, Tel Aviv; Displacements, 2007, at the Bat Yam Museum of Contemporary Art; The Rear, 2007, at The first Herzliya Biennial; Israeli Art From The Collection, 2007, Tel Aviv Museum of Art; Family, Tree, 2008, at Gallery 39, Tel Aviv; Family Traces, 2009, at the Israel Museum, Jerusalem.

== 2009–2013: From family photographs to imagination ==
In early 2009, Kühnemann had his first comprehensive solo exhibition in Germany, titled Schichten (layers). Several of the paintings in the exhibition had already been displayed in different exhibitions in Israel; others were created for this purpose.

The exhibition was held at the Samuelis Baumgarte Gallery in Bielefeld and was accompanied by a comprehensive catalog in German and English.

Kühnemann's intense interest in family photographs spurred in him curiosity regarding his family and cultural roots, and alongside his attempt to push his artistic and professional limits, this lead him to move to his mother's hometown, Berlin.

His geographic relocation was accompanied by a transformation in his work. The new surroundings and cultural contexts were expressed in an intense search and in experiments conducted in his studio. During these years, he was still using family photographs as his reference, but he was also trying to look for a new, more abstract visual language, one not based on a dictated extrinsic narrative.

The main exhibition representing his work during this period is Balancing Acts, 2011, at the Alon Segev Gallery, Tel Aviv. In a review of the exhibition for Haaretz newspaper, Smadar Sheffi wrote: "Olaf Kühnemann's solo exhibition at the Alon Segev Gallery in Tel Aviv, is a sort of group exhibition by one man, in which he exhibits a colorful multiplicity of styles. The proximity between the figurative and abstract in Kühnemann's work is so great, that it seems like this is what he's referring to with the exhibition's name, 'Balancing Acts', alluding to an attempt at creating a general and balancing statement between shape, image and narrative... Kühnemann is not an artist who went through a sharp change of style. Like his paintings, that feel somewhat organic, his work's gradual change as it is presented in this exhibition also holds new possibilities for painting, that Kühnemann has yet to explore."

Another major exhibition of this period was held at the Alexander Ochs Galleries Berlin|Beijing in Berlin. Kühnemann showed two groups of paintings in the exhibition: large scale paintings on wood from 2007 to 2008, alongside paintings in which the photographs are only a conceptual point of reference, falling apart into abstraction.

== 2014–2017: Abstraction and free association, oil and paper ==
In the 2014 Turpentine Dreams exhibition, that was held at the Fienberg Projects gallery in Tel Aviv, Kühnemann displayed a group of paintings which were the result of his search for a new visual language. At this stage, he completely detached himself from photos and external images, and consciously attempted to paint without creating a narrative or images that might be recognized and related. "Kühnemann is seemingly undermining the visual expertise he has accumulated, and creates paintings mediating between abstraction and delusion," wrote the exhibition's curator, Yam Hameiri. "On the canvas, with many layers of paint, he creates manual, unique, naïve and sophisticated gestures that mix together to create a feeling of urgency and heat that is lacking in narrative."

Following this exhibition, Kühnemann continued developing ideas around abstraction and free association, while experimenting with creating a workspace out of paper, inside of which his direct and indirect work processes were allowed to accumulate: newspapers that were used for covering the floor became pieces of art, parts of bicycles, the skin of fruit, the background music – at this point, Kühnemann chose to accumulate the by-products of his work instead of editing them out. The Heartworn Highways exhibition at CIRCLE1 gallery in Berlin served as a unifying and nurturing stage for this process. The exhibition revolved around impulses, and assembled moments of excitement and beauty. The exhibition has in fact presented Kühnemann's new work processes, which were meant to allow play and experiment with ideas of control versus surprise, discovering and interpreting the covered layers behind the paintings and in the subconscious.

Topics of identity and belonging are still at the heart of his work, but at this stage, they are mediated and treated in new ways. Kühnemann takes an interest in creativity that develops precisely out of the dead-end position of routine work in the studio, and through the challenge of being productive and finding inspiration.

In 2015, he was accepted to Künstlerhaus Bethanien residency program in Berlin. During his 15 months of participating in the program, he produced over 1000 A4 size works on paper. This time, the series of works contained tensions between two tendencies: intuitiveness and expressiveness alongside daily work discipline and focusing on a single size of paper; basic and almost childish images (a boat, sun, a bird, a flower, an ocean) alongside uncensored pornographic scenes.

At the exhibition that concluded his stay at the program, Kühnemann displayed 650 of these works on a single wall. Additionally, in the center of the room, in front of the wall, he laid a low wooden table and some objects on top of it: parts of bicycles, dried flowers, avocado peels, and many more. Each object was laid in a box that was built for it. The table functioned as a horizontal fifth wall, a floating painting that has become three dimensional. These various elements – the objects created in the working process and the paper works that are its result – constitute one complete work.

In a text about the exhibition that was published in the BE art magazine, the inherent Dialectic that was created as part of Kühnemann's new work process was discussed: "It is the simple, sometimes also ironic-atavistic appellatives that allow the painting process to unfold and organize associatively. No narrative emerges, no self-contained picture story; instead, this is a matter of free play and the encircling of associative landmarks. Precisely because Kühnemann practises this approach with strict consistency on a day-to-day basis, building up a routine, it leads – surprisingly – to the dissolution of routines."

In 2016, some of these works were shown in the exhibition Open Sketchbooks at the Herzliya Museum for Contemporary Art, that was curated by Orly Maiberg. The art critic Uzi Tzur wrote in Haaretz newspaper: "Kühnemann's sketchbook is particularly beautiful and sensitive. You can recognize the organic transition from the materialistic patchiness, that almost seems to be random, to the creation of the appearance, image, when the pencil sketch brings life to the array of spots, tells a tiny story with an element of movement and warmth. In every page of the sketchbook, the artists' natural and exemplary sense of composition is noticeable, the laying of the spots, the weighing between them and the rectangle page, the greasy and dry, the cold and the hot, and the touch of linear drawing upon the spots as the touch of creation."

== Selected solo exhibitions ==
- 2024 Entropy, Material - Raum für Buchkultur - Art Space, Zurich, Switzerland (curator: Oliver Rico).
- 2018 Bicycle Temple, Haifa Museum of Art, Haifa, Israel (curator: Svetlana Reingold).
- 2017 Small, Das Kleine Format, Upstairs Gallery, Oldenburg, Germany (curators: Carsten and Monica Meyer Bohlen).
- 2015 Paintings, A4 and some things | וכמה דברים A4, ציורים | Malerei, A4 und ein paar Dinge, Künstlerhaus Bethanien, Berlin, Germany.
- 2015 Between Here, Duo exhibition, Galerie Franzkowiak, Berlin, Germany (text: Christoph Tannert).
- 2014 Heartworn Highways, CIRCLE1, Berlin, Germany (curators: Jorgina Stamogianni and Doreet Levitte Harten).
- 2014 Turpentine Dreams, Feinberg Projects, Tel Aviv, Israel (curator: Yham Hameiri).
- 2012 Disposition, Upstairs Gallery, Meyerbohlenoldenburg, Oldenburg, Germany (curator: Dr. Monica Meyer-Bohlen).
- 2012 Painting Installation, collaboration between Eva & Bernard fashion label and Alexander Ochs Galleries Berlin|Beijing at Mercedes-Benz Berlin fashion week.
- 2011–2012 Balancing Acts, Alon Segev Gallery, Tel Aviv, Israel.
- 2010 Outside-in, Pavillon am Milchhof, Berlin, Germany (curator: Doris Knöfel, in cooperation with schir – art concepts).
- 2009 Schichten/Layers, Samuelis Baumgarte Galerie, Bielefeld, Germany (curators: Alexander Baumgarte & Friederike Schwarzer; Catalog).
- 2009 M.D.F Woods, Art+ Hotel, Tel Aviv, Israel (curators: Dana Golan & Aya Lurie; Catalog). Permanent Installation.
- 2008 Family, Tree, Gallery 39 for Contemporary Art, Tel Aviv, Israel (Text: Ruti Direktor, Catalog).
- 2007 Hornby Island, Tel Aviv Artists' Studios, Israel (curator: Vered Gani).
- 2007 Homescapes, The Heder Gallery, Tel Aviv, Israel (curator: Milana Gitzin-Adiram).
- 2005 Family Papers (It's Me: Auto/biography), Herzliya Museum of Contemporary Art, Israel (curators: Joshua Simon & Dalya Levin).
- 1999 Golem, Start Art Gallery, Tel Aviv, Israel.
- 1995 Painting and Drawing, Zvi Lachman's Private Workshop, Herzliya, Israel.

== Selected group exhibitions ==
- 2024 Innocence Disrupted - Children in War Time, Tel Aviv & Jerusalem, Israel (curators: Ido Bruno, Ruthi Kantor, Ido Dolev).
- 2023 Blood Works as part of TABOO, "Three Attempts at Goyification", a film by Michaela Kobas-Mark, CLB Berlin, Germany (curators: Rachel Liebeskind & Olaf Kühnemann).
- 2023 And If We Were Close - works from the Doron Sabag Art Collection, Ramat Hasharon Contemporary Art Gallery, Israel (curator: Ravit Harari).
- 2023 Bait - a duo exhibition with Rachel Kohn, Odalisque art space, Berlin, Germany (curator: Andrea Morein).
- 2021 Being Here , Kommunale Galerie Berlin, Germany (curator: Birgit Szepanski).
- 2021 Bidud Residency, a collaboration with artist Galia Pasternak, online exhibition during Covid 19 (curators: Noy &Tamir).
- 2021 Carolla's Dolls, Zuzu Gallery, Emek Heffer, Israel (curator: Rotem Ritov).
- 2020 Perspectives on Cartography, Chapter1: Snapshots & Transitions, CLB Berlin, Germany, (curator: Lisa Gordon).
- 2020 Family Business, Centrum Judaicum, Berlin, Germany (curators: Anke Paula Böttcher, Dorit Rubin Elkanati, Dr. Dorothea Schöne).
- 2019 Paper Positions Berlin Art Fair, Berlin, Germany (Curator: Sari Golan, The Triangle Art).
- 2018 Where have all the flowers gone? Alexander Ochs Private, Berlin, Germany (curator: Alexander Ochs).
- 2018 Day & Knife, CIRCLE1 Platform for Art and Culture, Berlin, Germany (curator: Ofir Dor).
- 2018 Play/Ground, Cuckoo's nest, Tel Aviv, Israel (curator: Tamara Admoni).
- 2018 Berlin Inc., Studio Hugo Mayer, Berlin, Germany (curator: Hugo Mayer).
- 2018 Body Talk. The Scar the Scheme the Sketch and the Scratch, Body representations in 70 years of art from Israel, CIRCLE1 Platform for Art and Culture, Berlin, Germany (curators: Alona Harpaz and Ofir Dor).
- 2018 #Metoo, Binyamin Gallery, Tel Aviv, Israel (curator: Sari Golan).
- 2017 Small things:good things. Das Kleine Format, Alexander Ochs Privat Berlin, Germany.
- 2017 Art.Israel-art.is.real, Art Market Budapest, Hungary (Represented by The Triangle Art).
- 2017 Berliner Liste, Duo Exhibition with Jenny Rafalson, Berlin, Germany.
- 2017 Fresh Paint Art fair #9 (guest artist with The Triangle Art), Tel Aviv, Israel.
- 2016 works on paper, Liza Gershuni Gallery, Tel Aviv, Israel (curator: Liza Gershuni).
- 2016 Arena, The New Gallery Artists' Studios Teddy, Jerusalem, Israel (curator: Carmit Blumensohn).
- 2016 Mother, I have reached the land of my dreams, ID Festival Israel-Germany, Berlin, Germany (curators: Alona Harpaz & Sharon Horodi, CIRCLE1).
- 2016 The Dirty Three, Open Sketchbooks #2, Herzliya Museum of Contemporary Art, Herzliya, Israel (curator: Orly Maiberg).
- 2016 Object of Desire, The Triangle Art, Tel Aviv, Israel (curator: Sari Golan).
- 2016 SEIN.ANTLITZ.KORPER. ECCE HOMO? ECCEHOMO!, Berlin, Germany (curator: Alexander Ochs).
- 2016 Contemporary Visions VI, BEERS London, London, United Kingdom.
- 2015 Germany, mon Amour! Contemporary in Germany. Art. Architecture. Design, Cini Foundation on the occasion of the Venice Biennale (curator: Peter Noever).
- 2015 Roundabout, CIRCLE1, exhibition in IDFestival Berlin, Germany (curator: Rotem Ruff).
- 2015 Beuys, Beuys, Beuys, Contemporary By Golconda, Tel Aviv, Israel (curator: Liav Mizrahi).
- 2015 Midday Summer Dream, Feinbergs Projects, Tel Aviv, Israel (curator: Yham Hameiri).
- 2013 Opening exhibition, CIRCLE1, Berlin, Germany (curator: Doreet LeVitte Harten).
- 2013 Go Figure, Ha'agaf gallery, Haifa, Israel (curator: Yaara Oren).
- 2011 Facelook, Tel Aviv Museum of Art (curator: Sara Reiman Shor).
- 2011 Update your Reality, Alexander Ochs Galleries Berlin | Beijing (curator: Alexander Ochs, in cooperation with schir – art concepts).
- 2009 Zu Tisch, Berliner Kabinett, Galerie im Turm, Berlin, Germany (curators: Frank Dirsch & Dorit Bearach).
- 2009 (Tel Aviv), Galerie Ardizon, Bregenz, Austria (curator: Heimo Wallner, Text: Johanna Lettmayer).
- 2009 Family Traces, The Israel Museum, Jerusalem, Israel (curator: Tamar Manor-Friedman).
- 2009 Lo-li-ta, Office in Tel Aviv Gallery, Tel Aviv, Israel (curator: Ron Bartosh).
- 2009 In Drawers, Kalisher, Tel Aviv, Israel (curator: Dr. Guy Morag Tzepelewitz).
- 2009 Artists at Work, Hagada Hasmalit, Tel Aviv, Israel (curators: Eden Bannet & Adam Abulafya).
- 2009 Fresh Paint #2, Israeli Art Fair, Tel Aviv, Israel.
- 2009 Passages, Gallery 10, Rehovot, Israel (curator: Carmit Blumensohn).
- 2008 Facing the Sea, cinematheque Tel Aviv and Ness Ziona, Israel (curator: Yehudit Mezkel, Catalog).
- 2008 Fresh Paint #1, Israeli Art Fair, Tel Aviv, Israel.
- 2008 Vergescapes, Kiryat Tiv'on Gallery, Israel (curator: Tali Cohen-Garbuz).
- 2007 Traces III, The Jerusalem Drawing Biennial, Israel (curator: Dalya Manor, Catalog).
- 2007 Displacements, Bat Yam Museum For Contemporary Art, Israel (curator: Milana Gitzin-Adiram, Text: Lea Abir, Catalog).
- 2007 The Beautiful Void, Gallery 39, Tel Aviv, Israel (curator: Tal Lanir).
- 2007 The Rear, The first Herzliya Biennial, Israel (curators: Joshua Simon & Dalya Levin, Catalog).
- 2007 Gouaches, Residency Hotel Pupik Schrattenberg, Austria (curator: Heimo Wallner).
- 2007 Israeli Art From The Collection, Tel Aviv Museum of Art, Israel (curator: Ellen Ginton).
- 2006 Paperwork, The Heder Gallery, Tel Aviv, Israel (curator: Milana Gitzin-Adiram).
- 2006 Today Even The Drawers Are Winners, Klara Wallner Gallery, Berlin, Germany (curator: Klara Wallner).
- 2004 Pets, Time For Art Gallery, Tel Aviv, Israel (curator: Tali Cederbaum).
- 2002 Where Are The Children, Givon Gallery Tel Aviv / Museum of Art, Ein Harod, Israel (curator: Noemi Givon).
- 2001 Nes Ziona and Kfar Saba City Gallery, Israel (curator: Danoush Lachman).
- 2000 Drawing Show, David-Yalin college Gallery Jerusalem, Israel (curator: Tamara Rickman).
- 1997 Alumni Show, NY Studio School Gallery, Manhattan NY, USA.
- 1994 Graduates Show, Parsons School of Design Gallery, Manhattan NY, USA.
- 1993 Young Painters, The Painting Center, Manhattan NY, USA.
- 1993 National Arts Club, Manhattan NY, USA.

== Awards, Grants, Prizes ==
- 2022, The Power of the Arts Prize (together with the LABA Berlin team).
- 2020, Process Support Grant, Framed Berlin.
- 2014 Jurors' Pick, 100 Painters of Tomorrow, Thames & Hudson.
- 2008 Isracard Award, Tel Aviv Museum of Art, Israel.
- 1994 Scholarship for Arts, Parsons School of Design, Manhattan NY, USA.
- 1992–3, Two Awards of Excellence for Painting, National Arts Club, Manhattan NY, USA.

== Teaching ==
2021–present: Co-founder and Creative Director at LABA Berlin Artist Fellowship Program, which in 2024 is focused on creating a space for Muslim-Jewish exchange (MAR’A’YEH).

2003–2009: HaMidrasha Faculty of the Arts, Kfar-Sava, Israel.

2007–2009: Avni institute of Art and Design, Tel Aviv, Israel.

2005–2007: Hatachana, Tel Aviv, Israel.

== Collections ==
Tel Aviv Museum of Art, Bank Hapoalim collection, ORS Doron Sabag collection, Igal Ahuvi collection, Givon Gallery collection, Anette Bollag-Rothschild collection, Judith Yovel Recanati collection, Ifat Gurion collection and various private collections in Israel, Germany, Switzerland, USA and Tonga.
