= Coenraad =

Coenraad is a Dutch given name. Notable persons with that name include:

- Coenraad van Beuningen (1622–1693), diplomat for Dutch Republic
- Coenraad Beyers (1893–1975), South African historian, archivist, and herald
- Coenraad Bloemendal (born 1946), Canadian cellist
- Coenraad Bron (1937–2006), Dutch computer scientist who worked with Edsger W. Dijkstra on Algol-68
- Coenraad de Buys (1761–1821), Cape Colony cattle raider
- Hasselt (1797–1823), Dutch physician, zoologist, botanist and mycologist
- Coenraad Hiebendaal (1879–1921), Dutch rower who competed in the 1900 Summer Olympics
- Coenraad Johannes van Houten (1801–1887), Dutch chemist and chocolate maker
- Barend Coenraad Petrus Jansen (1884–1962), Dutch chemist and biochemist who isolated vitamin B1
- Coenraad Jacob Temminck (1778–1858), Dutch aristocrat and zoologist

== See also ==
- Coen (disambiguation)
- Koenraad
- Conrad (name)
