= Jean-Robert Petit =

French scientist

Jean-Robert Petit is a French scientist. He studied chemistry and physics at the University of Grenoble and received a PhD in 1984 in paleoclimatology on the study of the aeolian dust record from Antarctic ice cores.

== Academic works ==
In 1999 he was the lead author of a study published in Nature, "Climate and atmospheric history of the past 420,000 years from the Vostok ice core, Antarctica." The paper presented the first long climate record from the ice. It provided a continuous record of temperature and atmospheric composition. The data extracted from this ice core had implications throughout the fields of glaciology and paleoclimatology. One of the concluding remarks was that present day levels of carbon dioxide and methane seem to have been unprecedented during the past 420,000 years. The paper has been cited 3953 times to date.

== Ice cores ==
He was also a member of the EPICA project, a European team that drilled an ice core at Dome C that provided, in 2004, a 740,000-year climate record.

== See also ==
- Dome C
- Concordia Station
- Vostok Station
- Dome F
- ice core

== Bibliography ==
- Jean-Robert Petit, Vostok, Le dernier secret de l'Antarctique, éditions Paulsen, Paris, 2013
