= Koenders =

Koenders is a Dutch patronymic surname (originally: son of Koen). It may refer to the following notable people:

- Axel Koenders (born 1959), Dutch triathlete
- Bert Koenders (born 1958), Dutch foreign minister (as of 2014)
- Julius Gustaaf Arnout Koenders (1886–1957), Surinamese Sranan linguist
- Milano Koenders (born 1986), Dutch footballer
- Mike Koenders (born 1992), German footballer
- Nathalie Koenders (born 1977), French politician
