= European Project for Ice Coring in Antarctica =

Research project

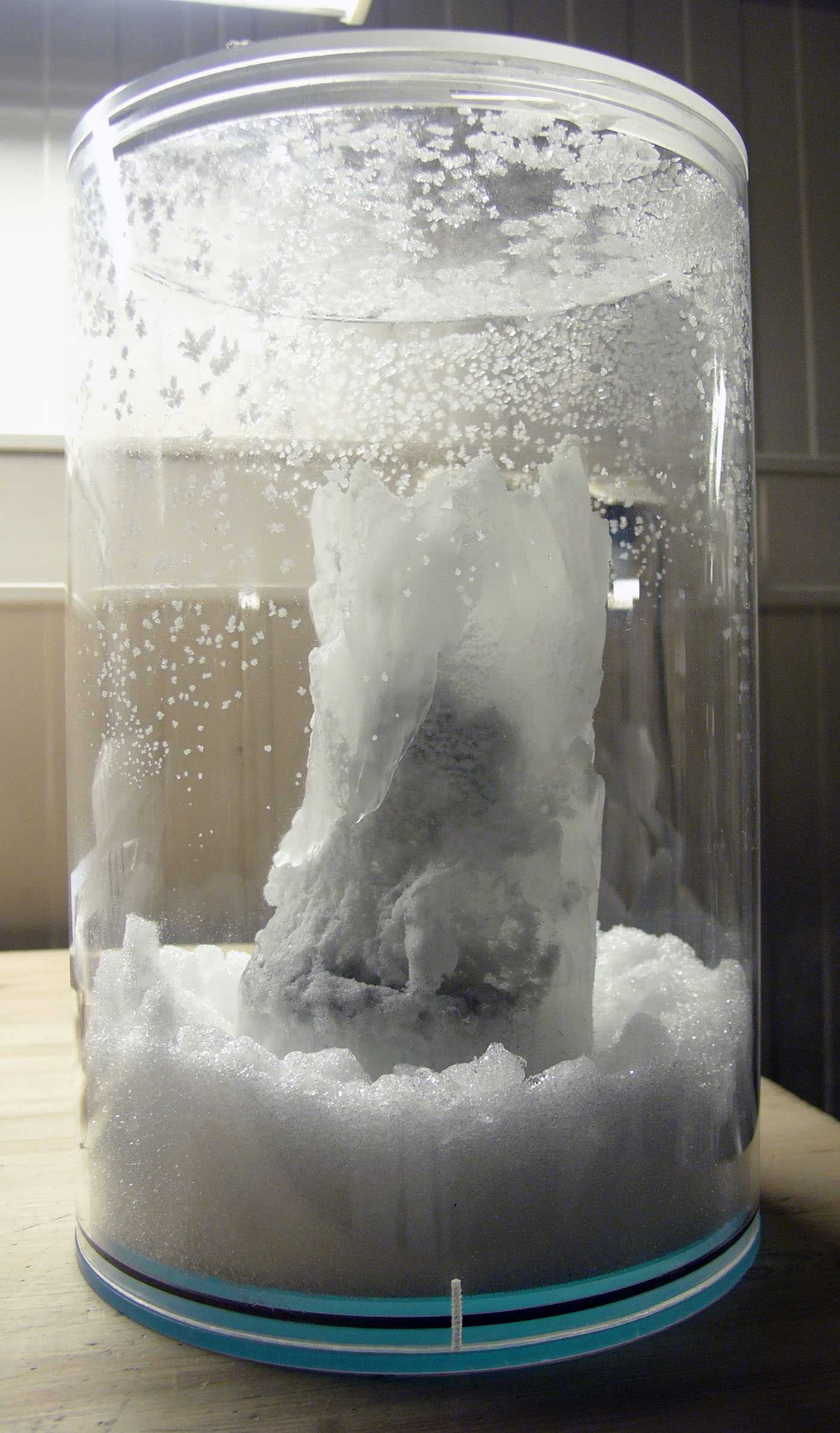
End of the EDML ice core from a depth 2775 m; consists of meltwater which has formed at the basis of the ice sheet; the core was drilled 2002-2004 through the Antarctic ice sheet in the area of Dronning Maud Land by the project EPICA

The European Project for Ice Coring in Antarctica (EPICA) is a multinational European project for deep ice core drilling in Antarctica. Its main objective is to obtain full documentation of the climatic and atmospheric record archived in Antarctic ice by drilling and analyzing two ice cores and comparing these with their Greenland counterparts (GRIP and GISP). Evaluation of these records will provide information about the natural climate variability and mechanisms of rapid climatic changes during the last glacial epoch.

Deep drilling took place at two sites in Antarctica: Concordia Station on dome C and Kohnen Station.

The European Science Foundation EPICA Programme (1996–2005) provides co-ordination for EPICA drilling activities on dome C and Kohnen Station, which are supported by the European Commission and by national contributions from Belgium, Denmark, France, Germany, Italy, the Netherlands, Norway, Sweden, Switzerland and the United Kingdom.

In 2008 the project received the Descartes Prize for research.

== Concordia Station on dome C ==
The EPICA and Vostok cores compared

This site (75°06′S 123°21′E, 3233 m above sea level, 560 km from Vostok Station) was chosen to obtain the longest undisturbed chronicle of environmental change, in order to characterise climate variability over several glacial cycles, and to study potential climate forcings and their relationship to events in other regions. The core goes back 740,000 years and reveals 8 previous glacial cycles. Drilling was completed at this site in December 2004, reaching a drilling depth of 3270.2 m, 5 m above bedrock. Present-day annual average air temperature is −54.5 °C and snow accumulation 25 mm/y. Information about the core was first published in Nature on 10 June 2004.

The picture shows delta deuterium data (a proxy for temperature: more negative values indicate lower temperatures) from both EPICA and Vostok. The upper plot, with x-axis being age (years before 1950) clearly shows the extra information in the EPICA core before the start of the Vostok record. The lower picture, plotted against depth, shows how compressed the deeper parts of the cores are: the earliest 100 kyr (thousand years) of the EPICA core are in the bottom 100 m of the core.

Before 400 kyr the character of the ice ages are seen to be somewhat different: interglacial warmth is distinctly less warm than the four most recent interglacials; however, the interglacial periods before 400 kyr occupied a much larger proportion of each cycle than subsequently. The interglacial 400 kyr ago, which is believed (from arguments about the configuration of the orbital parameters of the earth) to be an approximate analogue to the current interglacial, was quite long: 28 kyr. The Nature paper argues that if this analogue is accepted, then the current climate would be expected to continue like today's, in the absence of human influence (which it states is unlikely, given the predicted increases in greenhouse gas concentrations).

Further analysis of the core is hoped to extend the record back somewhat further, possibly as far as the Brunhes–Matuyama magnetic reversal, believed to be at about 780 kyr.

The core time scale is derived from the measured depth scale by a model incorporating surface snow accumulation variations, ice thinning, basal heat fluxes, etc., and is empirically "tied" at 4 times by matches to the marine isotopic record.

== Kohnen Station, Dronning Maud Land ==
Kohnen Station is located at 75°00′S 00°04′E, 2892 m above sea level. Higher annual snowfall and sensitivity to conditions over the South Atlantic will allow the study of any links between shifts in the Atlantic Ocean circulation and the rapid climate events detected over Greenland.

== Beyond EPICA – Oldest Ice ==
The European project Beyond EPICA – Oldest Ice (BEOI) aimed at obtaining older ice cores, which were expected to provide climatic data up to 1.5 million years old. A drill site, "Little Dome C", was chosen in 2022.

Samples collected during the project show that concentrations of greenhouse gases during the warmest periods of the last 800,000 years have never exceeded the levels seen since the start of the Industrial Revolution. Beyond EPICA coordinator Carlo Barbante said that carbon dioxide levels are now 50 percent higher than at any time in the past 800,000 years.

At the start of 2025 it was announced that after they drilled to a depth of 2800m, they found in the uppermost 2480m the oldest possibly unbroken ice core record to date. It spans to 1.2 million years ago and thus covers a period when glaciation cycles changed from 41 kyr to 100 kyr. In March 2025, these samples, representing the oldest ice ever extracted from Antarctica, left the continent aboard RV Laura Bassi stored at -50°C and were expected to arrive in Europe on 16 April. Between 23 and 25 April 2025, the samples were transported from Trieste to Bremerhaven by truck. Initial analyses conducted during 2025 at the Alfred Wegener Institute confirmed that the ice samples are indeed more than 1.2 million years old.

The fifth and final drilling campaign of BEOI begun in November 2025.

== See also ==
- Vostok Station
- Kohnen Station
- Dome F
- Jean Robert Petit
- 2025 in Antarctica
