= Koen van Velsen =

Dutch architect

- Born: July 17, 1952 (age 73); Hilversum, Netherlands
- Occupation: Architect
- Awards: Mart Stam Prize (1989); Rietveld Prize (1997); A.J. van Eck Award (1990); BNA KUBE (2002)
- Buildings: Library at Zeewolde

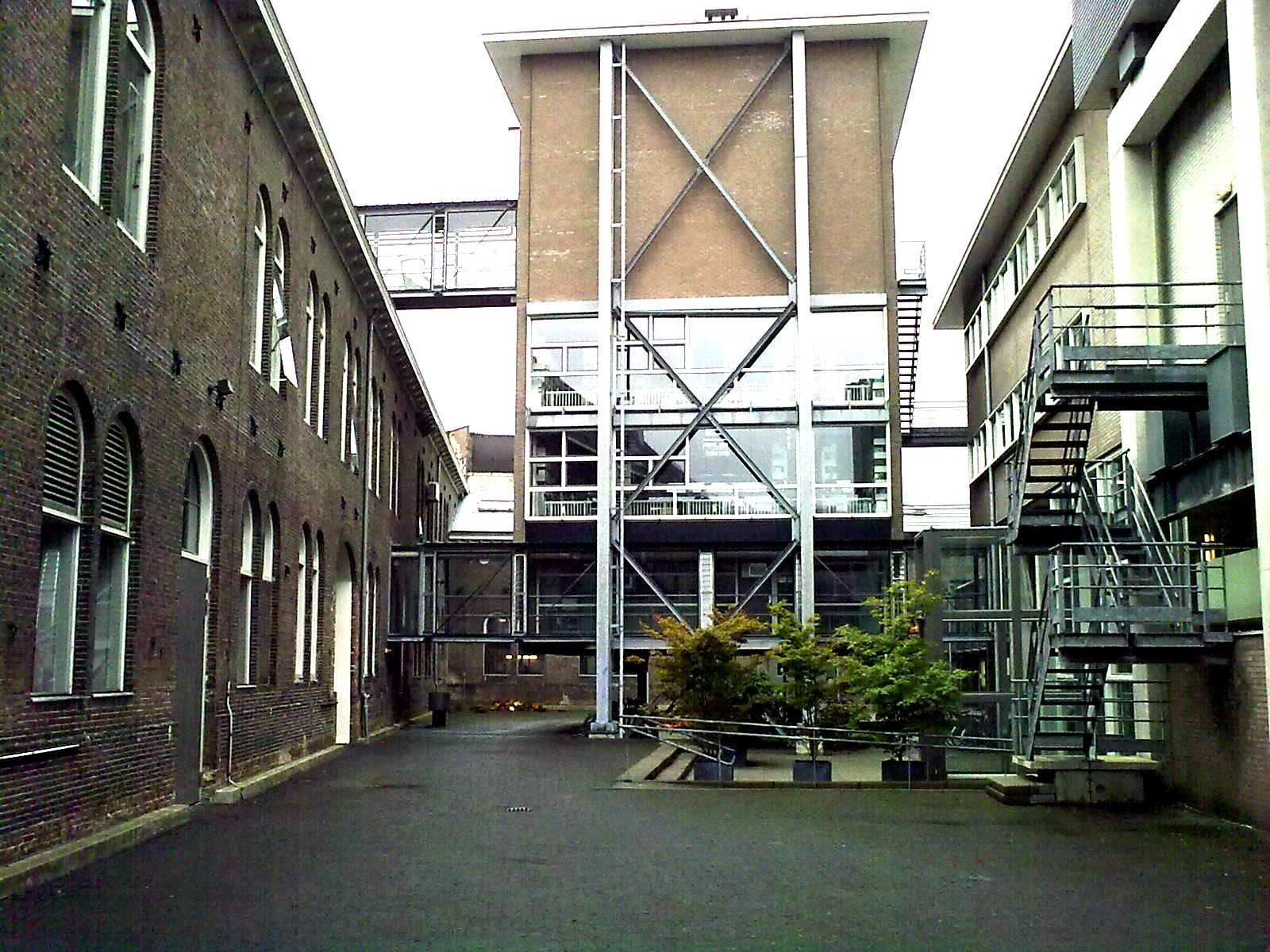
Courtyard of the Rijksakademie (Royal Academy of Visual Arts) in Amsterdam. Several of the newer buildings with interconnecting walkways were designed by van Velsen.

Koen Jozef van Velsen (born 17 July 1952) is an architect from Hilversum, Netherlands known for his design work on the Discothèque Slinger, rehabilitation center Groot Klimmendaal and the library in Zeewolde. His work employs a contextual design approach, free of a personal esthetic.

== Career ==
Van Velsen completed his formal education at the Academie van de Bouwkunst (Academy of Architecture) in Amsterdam in 1983.

Van Velsen's early work consisted mostly of additions and renovations to existing buildings. He typically incorporated contemporary elements into a historical framework, transforming structures in a way that earned him a reputation for creating "light and transparent" designs. His first major work was the library at Zeewolde, completed in 1989.

== Notable projects ==
Year Completed	City	Project	Sources
1992	Amsterdam	Rijksakademie van Beeldende Kunsten	
1995	Rotterdam	Megabioscoop Schouwburgplein	
1996	Utrecht	Universiteitsmuseum	
1996	Terneuzen	Stadskantoor	
1997	Terneuzen	ING Bank	
1999	Amsterdam	Woning Vos	
1999	Amsterdam	Nederlandse Film en Televisie Academie	
2001	Hilversum	Commisariaat voor de Media	
2003	Eindhoven	Kennispoort	
2006	Laren	Kantoorgebouw	
2009	Arnhem	Groot Klimmendaal	
2011	Apeldoorn	Entreegebouw Paleis Het Loo	
