= Igal Ahouvi =

Israeli businessman

- יגאל אהובי
- Born: March 1953 (age 73)
- Education: Tel Aviv University
- Occupations: Businessman; property investor; art collector
- Years active: 1981–present
- Spouse: Anat Ahouvi (divorced)
- Partner: Galit Gutman (2013-present)
- Children: 2

Igal David Ahouvi (Hebrew: יגאל אהובי; born March, 1953) is an Israeli businessman and art collector. Ahouvi made most of his fortune in real estate, and owns real estate in Israel, Europe and Vietnam. He was number 229 on The Marker's list of wealthiest Israelis for 2022

Ahouvi is the owner of Israel's largest private art collection, with over 1,100 works of art by international and Israeli artists. He studied accounting at Tel Aviv University and began his career in real estate in the early 1980s.

== Biography ==
=== Early life ===
Ahouvi studied accounting at Tel Aviv University and interned at the Eliezer Oren accounting office.

=== Career ===
After graduating from the university and finishing an internship in accounting, he began working in Profit, a real estate company controlled by Zvi Itzhaki. In the early 1980s, he began acquiring equity ownership in Profit in his first step towards becoming a real estate investor. In an interview, Ahouvi stated that he "likes income producing properties hates real estate development"

Ahouvi made his first investment abroad in 1986 in the UK, when he acquired an office building in Northampton for £1.5 million. In the following years, he focused on acquiring properties in Israel, especially in Tel Aviv.

In 1993, Ahouvi further established his business activities in Israel through Partam, a company he founded to handle his investments there. In 1994 Ahouvi began to raise capital from private investors and public companies, for investments in profitable real estate in the UK, and later in Europe. The entry into the British market was well-timed, after the collapse of real estate prices there in the early 1990s, a period of rising prices began. By 2005, Ahouvi managed to amass, together with partners, a property portfolio valued at £3 billion. In those years, he made many investments in partnership with Yitzhak Tshuva's Delek Real Estate Company. They purchased a series of properties, including NCP (National Car Parks), which owned about 100 high-rise parking lots in London and other cities, and sold it at a considerable profit after a year. At the end of 2005, Delek Real Estate and Ahouvi bought 16 Hilton hotels in the UK for NIS 3.3 billion. After the sale, Hilton rented the hotels from the group for a period of 30 years.

In January 2006, Ahouvi sold an office building in Manchester, which he had originally purchased in July 2000 for £26.75 million, for £36.4 million. He immediately entered into another large deal with Delek Real Estate" and the Royal Bank of Scotland for the purchase and rental of 46 hotels belonging to the Marriott chain for NIS 8.3 billion. In September 2006, he purchased the private hospital Herzliya Medical Center, and in February 2009 sold it to Israeli's largest HMO, Calit Health Services. In March 2007, Ahouvi acquired control of the real estate company Ravad, which is traded on the Tel Aviv Stock Exchange. Through Ravad, he raised several hundreds of millions of NIS in bonds, and invested in various properties throughout Europe. In one transaction Ahouvi purchased, directly and through Ravad, in partnership with George Horesh, six Debenhams stores in the UK for 384 million NIS, and sold them after six months to a large British pension fund for approx. 438 million NIS. At the time, he also invested in properties in Israel, among other things he purchased the old commercial center in Ramat Aviv, and planned to build a residential tower in its place. Finally he sold the land.

Ahouvi found himself in a legal dispute over the hotel deal. One of the partners in the hotel deal sued Ahouvi for breach of contract. Delek Real Estate entered into a debt settlement, and finally the bank that financed the Marriott deal decided to exercise its rights and take over the properties. However, he quickly recovered from the crisis and returned to investing in real estate throughout Europe.

In 2010, he was appointed chairman of Ravad. At the beginning of 2017, Ravad entered into an investment in assisted living and nursing homes, purchasing 19 nursing homes in London and its surroundings, including 1,120 rooms, in partnership with the Beit HaZhav company.

in 2012, Ahouvi joined three Israeli businessmen and entered in an agreement to be a partner and the sole financier in a huge time sharing hotel project in Vietnam. The ALMA resort, situated on Long Beach in Nha Trang, was supposed to include 600 time sharing units on a 75 acres of land, and include a water park, mini golf, 12 pools and more. According to the agreement, Ahouvi would finance the venture and hold 88% of the shares through his company, Blenheim Property Group, and have financial control of the project. The other 3 partners would hold 12% through their company DRS and focus on planning and marketing the project. The company purchased the land for $3 million US.

In 2013, Ahouvi sold a building in Tel Aviv for 20 million dollars, and in February 2019 he sold control of Ravad after the stock suffered from a significant drop in value.

In the summer of 2015, in partnership with the Golden House, a subsidiary of the Rubinstein Group, Ravad acquired eight nursing homes in the UK for 370 million NIS.

== Art collection ==
Ahouvi devotes a lot of his time and resources to collecting art. The Igal Ahouvi Art Collection is Israel's largest private art collection, with over 1,100 artworks by Israeli and international artists. Ahouvi began collecting art towards the end of the 1990s, and gradually built a large private collection. His collection is stored in Israel and London. In 2008, Ahouvi appointed Sarit Shapira as its curator. Shapira left the position in 2014 and continued to serve as an artistic advisor to the collection. She was replaced by Matan Daube.

In 2013, Ahouvi rented most of the exhibition space of the Genia Schrieber University Art Gallery at the Tel Aviv University for a period of 4 years. The goal was to display a series of 12 exhibitions of artworks from his private collection, with free access to the public.

== Legal disputes ==
In October 2007, Ahouvi (through his company Blenheim Property Group) and Delek Global Real Estate, backed out of a deal to acquire 88 real estate properties from Swiss group Jelmoli for 3.4 billion CHF. Following an arbitration, the parties settled and Ahouvi and Delek agreed to pay 21.5 million CHF to Jelmoli.

In September 2008, Habas Group sued Ahouvi for breach of contract in the Hilton UK deal, after Ahouvi backed out of his obligation to acquire Habas's shares. In November 2010, the Tel Aviv district court ordered Ahouvi and Blenheim to pay Habas 3.1 million GBP in exchange for its 3.8% share. Ahouvi was further ordered to pay 1.3 million NIS in expenses and legal fees. The judge strongly criticized Ahouvi in her verdict. She wrote that throughout his entire testimony, it appeared he was repeatedly trying to avoid answering questions. She further wrote that "Ahouvi honors written contracts only when it is convenient for him and renounces them when it is not".

== Personal life ==
Ahouvi is divorced from Anat Ahouvi, with whom he has 2 children. Since he started his international business career, he divides his time and residence between Tel Aviv and London. After his divorce from Anat, he was in a relationship with Ifat Gurion, who was previously the third wife of Israeli billionaire businessman Idan Ofer.

Since 2013, he has been in a relationship with Israeli model and TV host Galit Guttman. In October 2017 the couple got engaged.
