= Heinz Kohnen =

German scientist and geophysicist

- Born: February 5, 1938; Oberhausen, Germany
- Died: 25 July 1997 (aged 59); Nienberge, Münster, Germany
- Citizenship: German
- Scientific career
- Fields: Geophysics; Polar research

Heinz Kohnen (5 February 1938 – 25 July 1997) was a German scientist and geophysicist known for his work in polar research. Kohnen helped determine the site of the first German Antarctic station during an expedition from 1979-1980. Kohnen-Station, a field station on Dronning Maud Land, Antarctica, is named after him.
