= Kohnen Station =

- Antarctic base
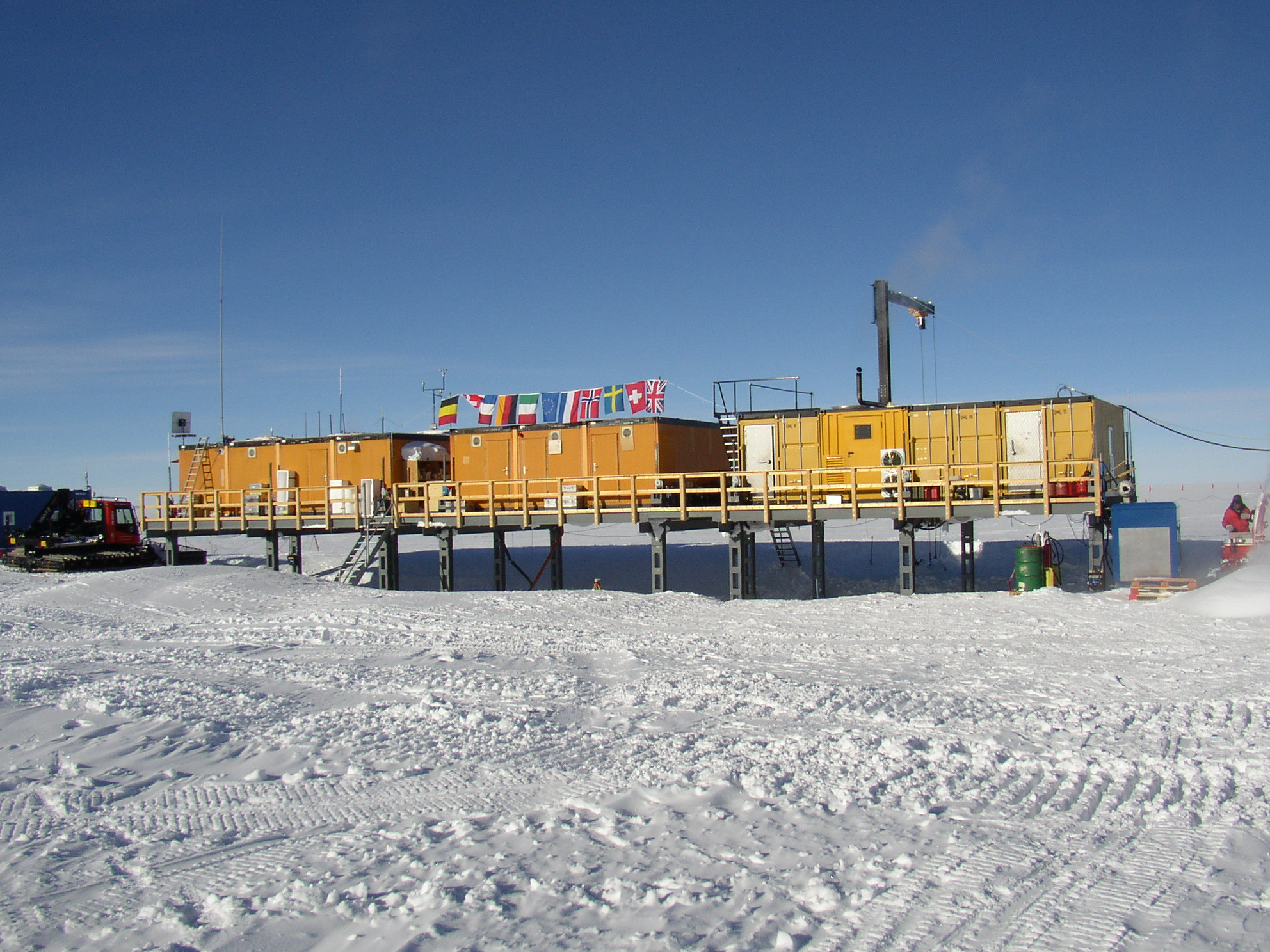
- Kohnen

- Location of Kohnen Station in Antarctica
- Coordinates: 75°00′07″S 0°04′00″E
- Country: Germany
- Location in Antarctica: Dronning Maud Land; Antarctica
- Administered by: Alfred Wegener Institute
- Established: 11 January 2001
- Elevation: 2,892 m (9,488 ft)

Population (2017)
  - Summer: 6
  - Winter: 0
- UN/LOCODE: AQ KHN
- Type: Seasonal
- Period: Summer
- Status: Operational
- Activities: Core drilling
- Website: Kohnen Station AWI

Kohnen Skiway
- IATA: none; ICAO: AT12

Summary
- Airport type: Private
- Location: Kohnen Station
- Elevation AMSL: 9,566 ft (2,916 m)
- Coordinates: 75°00′04″S 0°04′08″E

Map
- Location of airfield in Antarctica

Runways
Direction	Length		Surface
Direction	ft	m	Surface
17/35	2,957	901	Ice

Kohnen-Station is a German summer-only polar research station in the Antarctic, able to accommodate up to 28 people. It is named after the geophysicist Heinz Kohnen (1938–1997), who was for a long time the head of logistics at the Alfred Wegener Institute.

The station opened on January 11, 2001, in Dronning Maud Land. The station is located at 75°00'S, 00°04'E, and 2892 m above sea level. It is located 757 km southeast of Neumayer Station III, which lies on the Ekstrom Ice Shelf and provides logistics and administration for Kohnen-Station. Like the United Kingdom's Halley V station, the base is built on steel legs allowing the station to be jacked up as the height of the snow surface increases.

The station contains a radio room, a mess room, a kitchen, bathrooms, two bedrooms, a snow melter, a store, a workshop, and a power plant (100 kW). It is supplied by a convoy of 6 towing vehicles, which carry up to 20 tons each, and 17 sledges. The base is resupplied twice each year, with up to 6 sledge trains at a time. This traverse takes 9–14 days.

Sledges

About 17 sledges are kept at the station. They are mainly used for transport (pulled via a snowmobile) and logistics.

Towing vehicles

About a convoy of 6 towing vehicles are stationed. They are mainly used for logistics.

PistenBully

Around 3 PistenBully snowcats are stationed at the base. They are mainly used for logistics, filling the snow melter, and clearing the snow.

Kohnen station is the logistic base for the ice coring project in Dronning Maud Land, the European Project for Ice Coring in Antarctica (EPICA). A core was also drilled at Kohnen station.

In 2019, researchers found interstellar iron in Antarctica in snow from the Kohnen Station which they relate to the Local Interstellar Cloud

== See also ==
- List of Antarctic research stations
- List of Antarctic field camps
- Airports in Antarctica
