= Theo Koenen =

German footballer

Personal information
- Date of birth: 11 February 1890
- Date of death: 8 September 1964 (aged 74)
- Position: Defender

Senior career*
Years	Team	Apps	(Gls)
- Bonner FV

International career
1911	Germany	1	(0)
- * Club domestic league appearances and goals

Theo Koenen (11 February 1890 – 8 September 1964) was a German international footballer.
