= Barend Coenraad Petrus Jansen =

Dutch biochemist

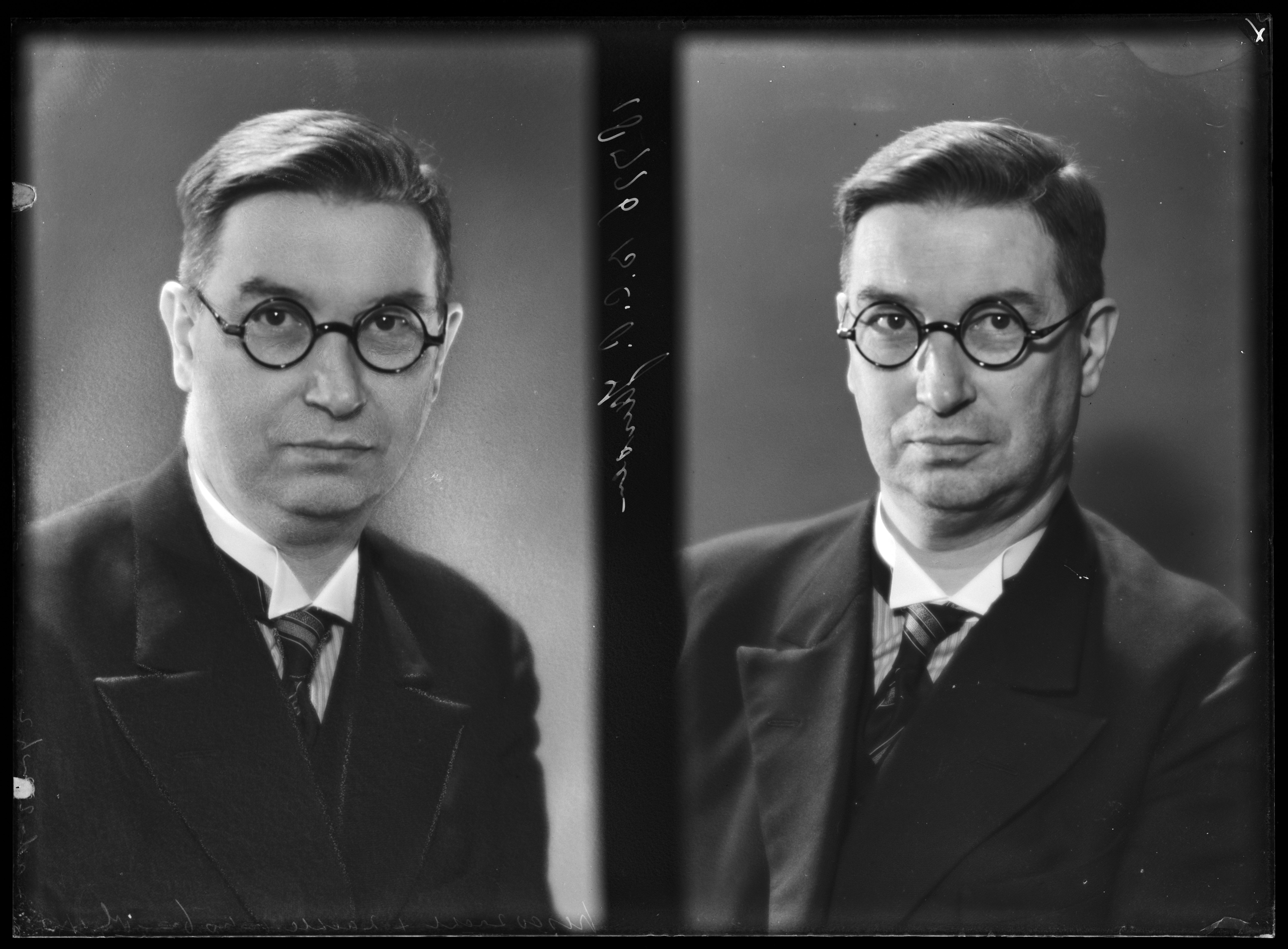
Jansen, Dr. Barend Coenraad Petrus (1884–1962)

B. C. P. Jansen (1 April 1884, Zwolle – 18 October 1962) was a Dutch chemist and biochemist. In the Dutch Indies, with his colleague W. F. Donath, he isolated in crystalline form an anti-beriberi factor (known as vitamine B1 or aneurin) from rice polishings and named it thiamine (sulfur-containing amine). It was the first vitamine to be obtained in pure form.

Jansen was elected a corresponding member of the Royal Netherlands Academy of Arts and Sciences in 1927, he resigned in 1929. He was re-admitted as member in 1946.
