= Dafi Kühne =

Swiss graphic designer (born 1982)

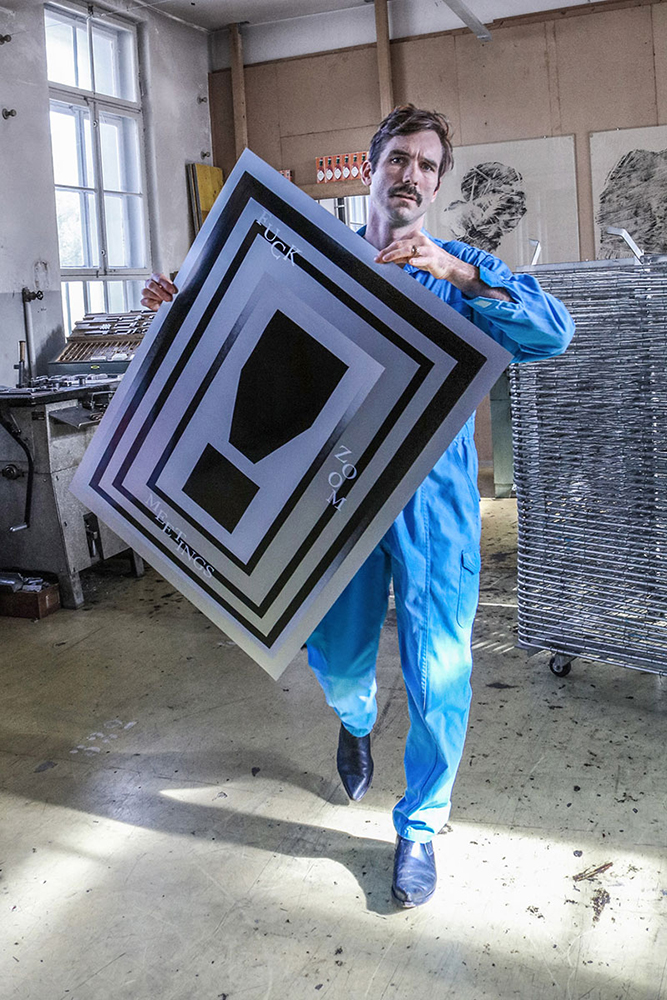
Dafi Kühne with his letterpress printed poster «F__k Zoom Meetings» (linocut), in his studio in Näfels, Switzerland, 2020

Dafi Kühne (* 1982 in Glarus, Switzerland) is a Swiss poster designer, graphic design educator and letterpress printer.

== Career ==
Dafi Kühne began his design education in Visual Communication in 2006 at the Zurich University of the Arts. After obtaining his Bachelor's degree, he opened his own poster design and letterpress printing studio "Babyinktwice" in Näfels in 2009. Kühne describes himself as a designer with a strong focus on production, thus closing the gap between design and product. The autonomy and his multi-hatted role as not only the designer, but also the maker of the tool that produces the design, is one of the main qualities and motivations for Kühne to work with analog letterpress production technique. Parallel to his studio activities, he has been teaching at universities in Switzerland, other European countries as well as the USA since 2011. In 2019, he completed his Master of Research in Typeface Design at the University of Reading. In 2016, Kühne initiated the Typographic Printing Program, a 12-day intensive program in for poster design and typography in Näfels with a broad international field of participants. In 2022 and 2024 satellite courses have been held at the Hoffmitz Milken Center for Typography at ArtCenter College of Design in Pasadena.

Kühne identifies as a designer of the digital generation. He is also a letterpress printer who learned the craft of printing only after commercial letterpress printing was replaced by offset printing. This non-traditional, and partly self-taught approach, opened up the scope for him to freely DIY experiment with letterpress printing technology. Through his combinations of different tools and technologies, to which he also refers to as "true printing" in analogy to the title of his 2016 designer monograph, Kühne is considered a pioneer in the revival and further development of letterpress technology. With his poster works, he wanders between the analog and digital worlds, creating manually printed contemporary works that are by no means nostalgic.

Since 2025 Dafi Kühne has been a member of the Alliance Graphique Internationale.

== Work and awards ==
His letterpress posters have been shown at international exhibitions, won international awards, and presented in printed publications. In 2014 and 2026 Kühne received the Culture Promotion Prize of the Canton of Glarus for his work as a poster designer. His online video series The Dafi Kühne Printing Show™ was awarded a Swiss Design Award in the category of mediation by the Federal Office of Culture (BAK) in 2021, as well as a TDC Award from the Tokyo Type Directors Club. His poster work can be found in the poster collection of Museum für Gestaltung Zürich, MK&G in Hamburg, the Archive at Hoffmitz Milken Center for Typography at Art Center in Pasadena, at the Poster House NYC as well as at the Letterform Archive in San Francisco. In 2025, he was awarded the first inaugural Prix Bataillard × Mudac for his approach that blends tradition and experimentation in typography.

== Solo Exhibitions ==
- Ginza Graphic Gallery, [ggg], Tokyo, Japan, 2026
- Werkstattschau, Gewerbemuseum Winterthur, Switzerland, 2024–2025
- Buchdruckplakate?, Museum für Druckkunst, Leipzig, Germany, 2023
- Baby Ink Twice, Hoffmitz Milken Center for Typography, Pasadena, CA, USA, 2022

== Publications ==
- Dafi Kühne – ダフィ・クーネ, gggBooks 145, 2026:

Introduction by Rick Griffith 13.5×19cm, 5.3×7.9 in 64 pages, 57 illustrations 2026, 978-4-88752-417-0, Japanese/English

- Poster Cult!, Lars Müller Publishers, 2024:

With photographs by Peter Hauser, contributions by Angelina Lippert (Director of Poster House NYC) and Christian Brändle (Director of Museum für Gestaltung Zürich), 24×30 cm, 9½×11¾ in 152 pages, 80 illustrations 2024, 978-3-03778-777-9, English

- True Print, Lars Müller Publishers, 2017:

Edited by Reto Caduff, with contributions by David Shields and Rudolf Barmettler, Design: Dafi Kühne 24 × 30 cm, 9 ½ × 11 ¾ in 152 pages, 182 illustrations hardback, 978-3-03778-509-6, English, 978-3-03778-508-9, German
