= Koen Creek =

Stream in the U.S. state of Missouri

Koen Creek is a stream in St. Francois County in the U.S. state of Missouri. It is a tributary of the Flat River.

The stream headwaters arise at 37°49′27″N 90°26′24″W and it flows generally northwest to its confluence with Flat River at 37°52′10″N 90°30′06″W on the east edge of Desloge adjacent to US Route 67.

Koen Creek has the name of the local Koen family.

== See also ==
- List of rivers of Missouri
