= Paul Kuhn =

Paul Kuhn may refer to:

- Paul Kuhn (tenor) (1874–1966), German operatic tenor
- Paul Kuhn (band leader) (1928–2013), German jazz musician and band leader

== See also ==
- Paul Kuën (1910–1997), German operatic tenor
- Paul Kühnle (1885–1970), German international footballer
