= Coen Verbraak =

Dutch journalist, television producer, and presenter

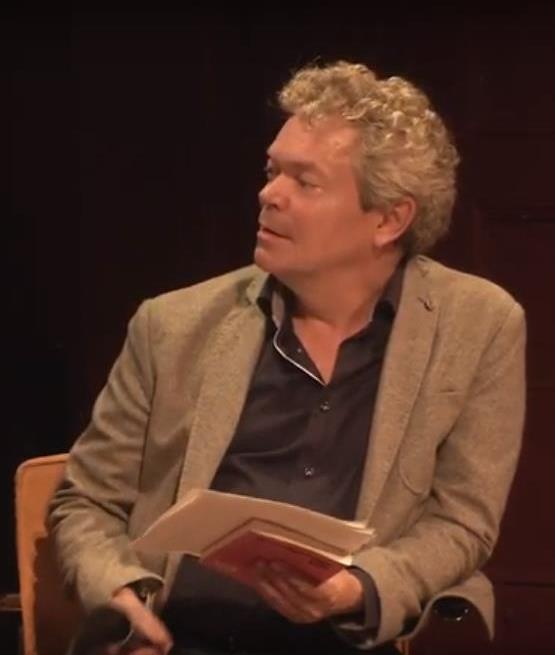
Verbraak (2019)

Coen Verbraak (born August 14, 1965 in Amsterdam) is a Dutch journalist and television producer and presenter.

== Interviews ==
Verbraak has worked as in interviewer for various media, including the Dutch magazine Vrij Nederland.

As of 1997 he is also active in television. He made the program Achter de lach (literally "Behind the laughter") for Dutch television, showing the life behind the scenes of Dutch cabaretiers. In 2009 he created the program Kijken in de ziel (literally "Gazing into the soul"), a series in which prominent people from a specific occupational group are interviewed about their work and their life. In 2014 the documentary Getekend, veteranen in therapie (literally "Marked, veterans in therapy") was released, in which Verbraak spent a year following veterans with post-traumatic stress disorder as they undergo therapy at Landelijk Zorgsysteem voor Veteranen (LZV) (literally "Dutch national care system for veterans"). This was the first time that an independent reporter was allowed access to the professional veterans' care system in The Netherlands.

Verbraak himself is often featured in talkshows. He appeared in De Wereld Draait Door and Knevel & Van den Brink.

== Prizes ==
- In 2010, Verbraak won the Zilveren Nipkowschijf for the program Kijken in de ziel.
- In 2007, Verbraak won the Luis prize for an interview with psychotherapist 'Louis Tas' in the magazine Vrij Nederland.
- In 2013, 2020, and 2025 Verbraak won the Sonja Barend Award, awarded annually in The Netherlands for best television interview.
