= Niklaus Kuhn =

Swiss politician (1934–2026)

- Kuhn in 1990

Member of the National Council
- In office 1990–1991

Member of the Cantonal Council of Zurich
- In office 1977–1987

Personal details
- Born: 16 September 1934 Zurich, Switzerland
- Died: 29 June 2026 (aged 91)
- Party: Evangelical People's Party
- Spouse: Eva Nagler (m. 1961)
- Parent(s): Karl Kuhn; Josefina Tschallener
- Occupation: Architect

Niklaus Karl Kuhn (16 September 1934 – 29 June 2026) was a Swiss architect and politician of the Evangelical People's Party (EVP). He founded an architectural firm in Zurich in 1962, sat in the Cantonal Council of Zurich from 1977 to 1987 and in the National Council from 1990 to 1991, and was a member of the bank council of the Zurich Cantonal Bank from 1994 to 2003. He focused on building and transport issues, among them the protection of Zurich's old town, and on spatial planning and environmental protection.

== Biography ==
Niklaus Kuhn was born on 16 September 1934 in Zurich, the son of Karl Kuhn, director of a forwarding company (Spediteurdirektor), and Josefina Tschallener. In 1961 he married Eva Nagler, daughter of Alois Nagler, deputy director of the Rentenanstalt.

Kuhn trained as an architectural draftsman (Hochbauzeichner) and attended a distance-learning Gymnasium (Ferngymnasium) in Zurich. From 1958 to 1961 he trained as an architect (Werkarchitekt) at the Hochschule für Bildende Künste in Berlin. In 1962 he founded the architectural firm Kuhn & Stahel in Zurich, and from 1989 he was co-owner and chairman of the board of directors of the firm Kuhn Fischer Partner Architekten AG.

In 1966 Kuhn joined the Evangelical People's Party. From 1971 to 1977 he was a member of the municipal council (Gemeinderat), from 1977 to 1987 of the Cantonal Council of Zurich, and from 1990 to 1991 of the National Council. From 1994 to 2003 he sat on the bank council (Bankrat) of the Zurich Cantonal Bank.

Kuhn devoted himself in particular to questions of building and transport, among them the protection of Zurich's old town, and to spatial planning and environmental protection. He died on 29 June 2026.
