= Friederun Köhnen =

German television chef and food industry executive (1942–2026)

Friederun Köhnen (née Frege; 22 September 1942 – 16 March 2026) was a German television chef and food industry executive, originally from Saxony, but based in North Rhine-Westphalia.

In 2007, she handed over to her son, Volker Köhnen, responsibility for the daily running of the family business (known in recent decades as "The Food Professionals Köhnen AG") she had built up. By this time, she was responsible for more than 100,000 published recipes. From 1965, she significantly influenced both home cooking and commercial food production in her native Germany.

== Life and career ==
The youngest of four children, Friederun Köhnen was born in Dresden during the war. When she was 23, with startup capital of 600 Marks, she launched herself as a freelance experimental chef. Working from improvised premises in the cellar of her parents' home, she quickly made an impression on the German food industry with her innovative ideas. Early on, she successfully approached the owners of the Müller's Mühle food conglomerate, a major producer of dried peas, beans and other pulses, with a proposal that many customers would prefer to buy these products in cans/tins, in order to avoid having to soak the contents overnight before they could be used for cooking. The idea caught on with consumers, and the resulting canned products can be seen as Germany's original "ready meals" ("Fertiggerichte").

Friederun Köhnen warns of the different taste preferences in different markets

"Take the example of tomato sauce. Their tastes differ a lot. The English eat it often, very very sweet. The Dutch with a lot of curry flavour, and the Germans with a much fruitier flavour. So [if you are selling product in Germany] you have to watch closely and then adapt your recipe for German taste."

"Zum Beispiel bei Tomatensoßen. Da ist der Geschmack sehr unterschiedlich. Die Engländer essen oftmals sehr, sehr süß. Die Holländer mit viel Curry, und die Deutschen mögen es insgesamt gerne fruchtiger. Also, da muss man schon gucken, das dem deutschen Geschmack dann anzupassen."

Friederun Köhnen, interviewed in 2012

The business launch coincided with wider changes in the food industry. A breakthrough came when Köhnen addressed the issues arising from the appearance in homes, during the 1960s and 1970s, of domestic freezers. Another branch of her entrepreneurial zeal ripe for expansion involved the recent arrival of supermarkets in West Germany. Many products which till that point had been sold fresh now needed to be packaged, and Köhnen was able to supply recipes and pictures of prepared dishes that could be printed on the packaging. In this way, she was able to introduce consumers to new recipe ideas. In a contract with the Galbani company, at that time little known outside Italy, she was able to introduce consumers to hitherto unknown culinary ingredients such as Mozzarella, Mascarpone and Rucola. She was one of those who revealed Tiramisu to sweet, toothed West Germans. Köhnen also popularised little known Asiatic ingredients such as Tofu and Soy sauce, including them in her recipes which by this time were appearing in her own cookery books.

In 1984, the private television company RTL was launched and Köhnen applied to supply a cookery show. Her proposal was that the show should be financed by producers of the items it featured, using what became known as product placement. The broadcaster accepted the initiative and Köhnen presented her own daily ten-minute cookery show, working alongside the moderator Horst Tempel. "Komm doch mal in die Küche" ("Come into the Kitchen") ran for four years, attracting audiences of several million, which commentators infer was far more than the RTL could have dreamed of so early in the channel's own life. Köhnen was not new to television at this point. Back in the 1970s, she had presented a "television cookery column" for WDR's Hier und Heute (Here and Today) magazine programme.

Over the years, the experimental kitchen evolved to become "The Food Professionals Köhnen AG", based in Sprockhövel, and today employing approximately 50 people with annual turnover around 3.7 million Euros. In 2010, Volker Köhnen, the son of the founder (and a qualified photographer and ships' mechanic) took over at the top of the executive board, having already been chief executive since 2007. Friederun Köhnen switched to the supervisory board. The business model embraces marketing campaigns, the development of new recipes and other food industry innovations. They also publish cookery books and produce product photographs in their own studios. Recent projects include the development of new product ideas such as a Currywurst (sausage) suitable for the Microwave and a Schnitzel suitable for the Toaster.

Köhnen died in self-determined decision on 16 March 2026, at the age of 83.
