= Volkmar Kühn =

German sculptor (born 1942)

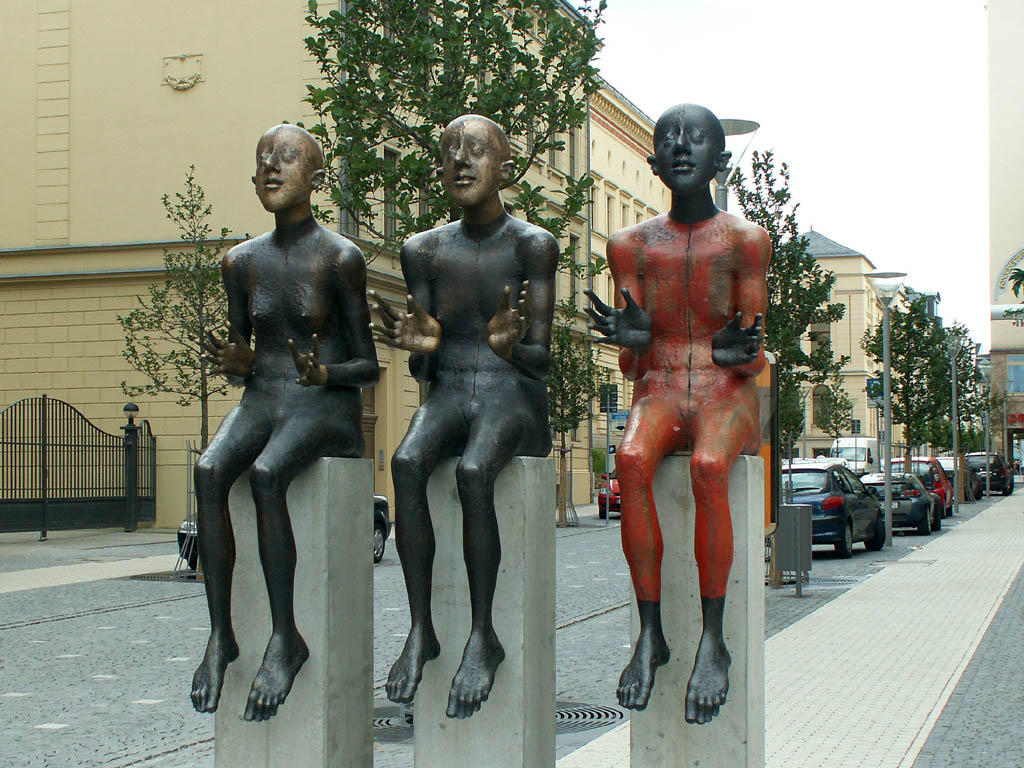
For Tolerance, Gera

Volkmar Kühn (born 27 July 1942, Königsee) is a German sculptor. Many of his works are exhibited in public spaces, especially in Gera. Heidecksburg museum acquired 60 of his bronze sculptures in 2015.
