= Koen Olthuis =

Dutch architect

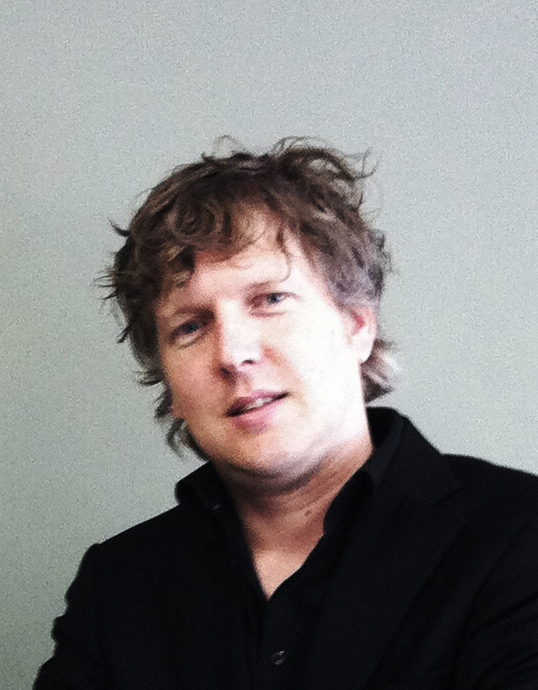
Koen Olthuis

Koen Olthuis (born 1971) is CEO / Principal Architect at Waterstudio. When Koen founded Waterstudio in 2003 it was the first office 100% focused on floating architecture and urban planning beyond the waterfront.

"Blue is Better" is the back bone of his vision and concepts and stands for the strong belief that cities can improve their performance by using water for space, flexibility and safety. He is the co-author of the book FLOAT! (Flexible Land On Aquatic Territory) and shares his ideas through lectures around the globe. He advices municipalities and governments who want to take their first step into the water to combat the effects of climate change and growing urbanization.

He graduated at the faculty of architecture and the faculty of industrial design at Delft University of Technology and finished his PhD City Apps: Improving Wetslum Livability with Floating Services, in 2021. DOI

Since 2011 he is member of the Flood Resilience Group at UNESCO-IHE, the water university in Delft where he introduced the topic of upgrading wetslums. In 2024, The New Yorker featured a profile on Koen and its work in the field of floating developments.

== Publications ==
Olthuis, Koen; David Keuning (9 November 2010). Float!: Building on Water to Combat Urban Congestion and Climate Change. Frame Publishers. ISBN 978-90-77174-29-6.

Olthuis, K., Benni, J., Eichwede, K., & Zevenbergen, C. (2015). "Slum Upgrading: Assessing the importance of location and a plea for a spatial approach." Habitat International, 50, 270–288. DOI

Olthuis, K., Tartas, P.B., & Zevenbergen, C. (2020). "Design Guidelines for Upgrading Living Conditions in Wetslums." In: Wang, C., Lim, S., & Tay, Z. (eds.), WCFS2019. Lecture Notes in Civil Engineering, vol 41. Springer, Singapore. DOI

Calcagni, L., Subramani, S., & Olthuis, K. (2024). "A comprehensive computational tool for performance-driven reasoning in floating building design and evaluation." Journal of Digital Landscape Architecture, 9–2024, 285–299. ISSN 2367-4253. DOI
