= Coen (name) =

Coen is a personal name of several origins. It exists as a masculine given name, and as a surname.

== Surname ==
As a surname it may be a variant of McCown, a derivative of the two Irish surnames O'Cadhain (of Connacht) and O'Comhdhain (of Ulster), it could be a Spanish or Italian variant of the Hebrew name Cohen meaning "priest", or it may be a Dutch patronym (see "Given name" below).

Coen and Levy are "Gaelic Irish surname(s) which have a foreign appearance but are nevertheless rarely if ever found indigenous outside Ireland" according to Edward MacLysaght.

People with this surname include:

- Andy Coen (1964–2022), American football coach
- Bill Coen (born 1961), American basketball coach
- Colin Coen (born 1958), Irish hurler
- Darren Coen, rugby league footballer of the 1980s
- Eleanor Coen (1916–2010), American painter
- Enrico Coen (born 1957), British plant biologist
- Ethan Coen (born 1957) American screenwriter
- Guido Coen (1915–2010), Italian-born British film producer
- Jan Pieterszoon Coen (1587–1629), Governor-General of the Dutch East Indies
- Joe Coen, Scottish footballer
- Joel Coen (born 1954), American screenwriter
- Johnny Coen (born 1991), Irish hurler
- Liam Coen (born 1985), American football player and coach
- Mario Pirani Coen (1925–2015), Italian journalist
- Martin Coen (1933–1997), Irish priest
- Noreen Coen (born 1993), Irish camogie player
- Séamus Coen (born 1958), Irish hurler
- Shunter Coen (1902–1967), South African cricketer
- Wilbur Coen (1911–1998), American tennis player

== Given name ==
The Dutch given name Coen (pronounced /kun/) is, like Koen, a short form of Coenraad/Koenraad, equivalent to the English Conrad. People with this given name include:

- Coen Cuser, 14th-century Dutch knight who founded a house for the poor
- Coen Dillen (1926–1990), Dutch footballer
- Coen Flink (1932–2000), Dutch actor
- Coen Gortemaker (born 1994), Dutch footballer
- Coen Hemker (born 1934), Dutch biochemist
- Coen Hess (born 1996), Australian rugby footballer
- Coen Hissink (1878–1942), Dutch silent film actor
- Coen Janssen (born 1983), Dutch keyboardist of the band Epica
- Coen de Koning (1879–1954), Dutch speed skater
- Coen Maertzdorf (born 1993), Dutch footballer
- Coen Moulijn (1937–2011), Dutch footballer
- Coen Ooft (1920–2006), Surinamese juror, politician and writer
- Coen van Oven (1883–1963), Dutch painter
- Coen Teulings (born 1958), Dutch economist
- Coen Verbraak (born 1965), Dutch journalist and television producer
- Coen Vermeltfoort (born 1988), Dutch racing cyclist
- Coen van Vrijberghe de Coningh (1950–1997), Dutch actor and musician
- Coen Zuidema (born 1942), Dutch chess player

== See also ==
- Koen
- Coenen
- Cohen (surname)
- Cohen (disambiguation)
- Cohn
- Kohn
- Cowan (surname)
- Cowen (disambiguation)
- Cowen (surname)
- Kohen
- Coen (disambiguation)
