= Koehne =

Koehne is a surname. Koehne, or Köhne, is the North German variant of the name Kuehne, or Kühne.

People with the surname include:

- Bernhard Karl von Koehne (1817–1887), Russian heraldist and numismatist
- Bernhard Adalbert Emil Koehne (1848–1918), German botanist
- Graeme Koehne (born 1956), Australian composer
- Jessica Koehne, American nanoscientist
