= Koen =

- Pronunciation: /kʊn/
- Gender: Male
- Language: Old Dutch

Origin
- Meaning: "brave", "capable", "hero"
- Region of origin: Low Countries

Other names
- Alternative spelling: Coen, Coene
- Related names: Conrad, Koenraad

Koen (Dutch pronunciation: [ˈkun]) is a Dutch language given name and surname, popular in the Netherlands and Flanders. Although the earliest direct attestation comes from Oudenaarde, East Flanders in 1272, it is known to have been derived from the Proto-Germanic name *kōnja-, meaning "brave". The given name is often an abbreviation of Koenraad.

Kōen is a Romanization of an unrelated Japanese family name.

== People with the given name ==
- Kōen (1207-1284/5), Japanese busshi during the Kamakura period
- Koen Andries, Belgian scientist
- Koen Barbé (born 1981), Belgian road bicycle racer
- Koen Bauweraerts (born 1983), Belgian hardstyle DJ and producer
- Koen Beeckman (born 1973), Belgian road bicycle racer
- Koen van der Biezen (born 1985), Dutch footballer
- Koen Bouwman (born 1993), Dutch cyclist
- Koen Casteels (born 1992), Belgian footballer
- Koen Crucke (born 1952), Belgian tenor, actor and politician
- Koen Daerden (born 1982), Belgian footballer
- Koen De Bouw (born 1964), Flemish actor
- Koen De Graeve (born 1972), Belgian actor
- Koen de Kort (born 1982), Dutch cyclist
- Koen Decoster, Belgian historian, philosopher and translator
- Koen Geens (born 1958), Belgian Flemish politician
- Koen Heldens (born 1986), Dutch mixing engineer
- Koen Huntelaar (born 1998), Dutch footballer
- Koen Kessels (born c. 1960), Belgian conductor and music director
- Koen Lamberts, Belgian psychologist
- Koen Lenaerts (born 1954), Belgian law scholar and judge
- Koen Naert (born 1989), Belgian long-distance runner
- Koen Olthuis (born 1971), Dutch architect
- Koen Onzia (born 1961), Belgian ballet dancer
- Koen Peeters (born 1959), Belgian writer
- Koen Pijpers (born 1969), Dutch field hockey player
- Koen Ridder (born 1985), Dutch badminton player
- Koen Schockaert (born 1978), Belgian footballer
- Koen Sleeckx (born 1975), Belgian judoka
- Koen Stam (born 1987), Dutch footballer
- Koen Van Langendonck (born 1989), Belgian footballer
- Koen Vandenbempt (born ca. 1970), Belgian organizational theorist
- Koen Vanmechelen (born 1965), Belgian artist
- Koen van de Laak (born 1982), Dutch footballer
- Koen van Nol (born 1974), Dutch judoka
- Koen van Velsen (born 1952), Dutch architect
- Koen Vervaeke (born 1959), Belgian diplomat
- Koen Verweij (born 1990), Dutch speed skater
- Koen Wauters (born 1967), Belgian singer and television presenter
- Koen Weuts (born 1990), Belgian footballer

=== Fictional characters ===
- Koen West, protagonist of the Australian television series Cleverman

== People with the surname Koen ==
- Charles Koen (1945–2018), American civil rights activist
- Erwin Koen (born 1978), Dutch footballer
- Fanny Koen, later Fanny Blankers-Koen (1918–2004), Dutch athlete
- J. P. Koen (born 1983), South African rugby player
- Karleen Koen (born 1948), American novelist
- Louis Koen (cricketer) (born 1967), South African cricketer
- Louis Koen (rugby union) (born 1975), South African rugby player
- Martsel Koen (born 1933), Bulgarian sports shooter
- Matilda Koen-Sarano (born 1939), Israeli writer
- Rik Koen (born 2004), Dutch racing driver
- Shaun Koen (born 1970), South African professional wrestler
- Sias Koen (born 1994), South African rugby player
- Tyron Koen (born 1997), South African cricketer

== People with the surname Kōen ==
- Kōen Kondo (born 1978), Japanese actor
- Ryōsuke Kōen (born 1948), Japanese mail artist known as Ryosuke Cohen

== See also ==
- Koen, Colorado
- Koen Creek, Missouri
- Coen (disambiguation)
