= Köhn =

- Municipality
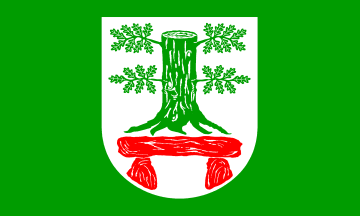
- Flag Coat of arms

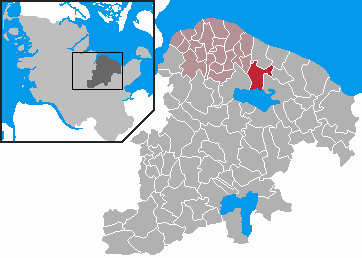
- Location of Köhn within Plön district
- Interactive map of Köhn
- Location within Germany Location within Schleswig-Holstein
- Coordinates: 54°21′N 10°27′E
- Country: Germany
- State: Schleswig-Holstein
- District: Plön
- Municipal assoc.: Probstei

Government
  - Mayor: Alwin Leber

Area
  - Total: 13.16 km^{2} (5.08 sq mi)
- Elevation: 36 m (118 ft)

Population (2025-12-31)
  - Total: 735
  - Density: 55.9/km^{2} (145/sq mi)
- Time zone: UTC+01:00 (CET)
  - Summer (DST): UTC+02:00 (CEST)
- Postal codes: 24257
- Dialling codes: 04385
- Vehicle registration: PLÖ
- Website: www.amt-probstei.de

Köhn is a municipality in the district of Plön, in Schleswig-Holstein, Germany.
