= Mary Meeker =

American venture capitalist and Wall Street securities analyst

Mary G. Meeker
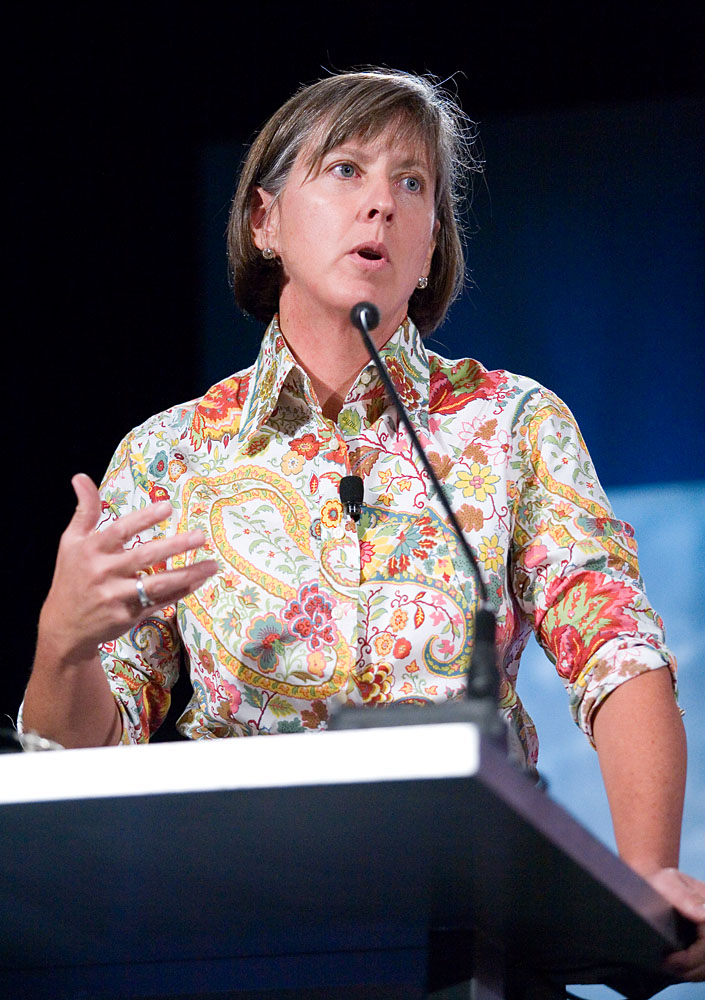
- Meeker at the Web 2.0 Conference in 2005
- Born: September 1959 (age 67); Portland, Indiana, U.S.
- Education: DePauw University (BA); Cornell University (MBA)
- Occupation: Venture capitalist
- Known for: Internet Trends Report

Mary Meeker (born September 1959) is an American venture capitalist and former Wall Street securities analyst. She is the founder and general partner at BOND (Bond Capital), a San Francisco–based venture capital firm. She previously served as partner at Kleiner Perkins.

Meeker has been described as the "Queen of the Internet" for her research on internet and technology companies during the dot-com era. She has consistently ranked among the world's leading venture capitalists, appearing on the Midas List and Forbes' World's 100 Most Powerful Women.

== Early life and education ==
Meeker was born in Portland, Indiana, to parents Gordon and Mary. She has an older brother, Dick, who is 21 years her elder. Her father Gordon was a "golf nut", which led to Meeker becoming captain of the golf team at Jay County High School; she credits her "intense and competitive" father for her type-A personality.

Meeker received a B.A. in psychology from DePauw University in 1981 and an MBA in finance from Cornell University in 1986. In May 2000, she received an Honorary Doctor of Letters degree from DePauw.

== Career ==
In 1982, Meeker joined Merrill Lynch as a stockbroker. After graduate school, she began as an analyst covering the technology sector at Salomon Brothers in 1986. She worked for Cowen from 1990 to 1991 before moving to Morgan Stanley to specialize in covering the personal computer and consumer software industries.

=== Morgan Stanley ===
In August 1995, Morgan Stanley served as lead manager for Netscape's IPO. In February 1996, Meeker and Chris DePuy at Morgan Stanley published "The Internet Report", a landmark industry report which became known as "the bible" for investors in the dot com boom. It was shared widely on the web and was also published as a book. Over the years, Morgan Stanley published similar landmark reports led by Meeker on online advertising, e-commerce, evolution of search, the Internet in China, and the mobile Internet.

Meeker was vilified in the press as one of a number of star analysts who were questioned in fraud investigations after the dotcom bubble burst in 2000 to 2002. Meeker was not charged with any wrongdoing. Morgan Stanley and nine other investment firms were compelled to participate in a global legal settlement.

In August 2004, Morgan Stanley, with Meeker as research analyst, served as lead manager for Google's IPO. Meeker is often credited for her comprehensive, rapid fire, annual Internet industry overviews at the Web 2.0 conferences in San Francisco each autumn.

During Morgan Stanley's tumultuous period in April 2005 when CEO Phil Purcell's management decisions were being intensely scrutinized, Meeker, along with colleagues Steve Roach, Byron Wien, and Henry McVey, wrote a letter to then co-presidents Zoe Cruz and Steve Crawford that expressed their concerns about the damage to the culture of the firm. The letter served as an important catalyst in increasing the focus of the board of directors on the depth of challenges facing Morgan Stanley at the time. In June 2005, John J. Mack was named CEO of Morgan Stanley, replacing Phil Purcell. A copy of the letter is included in Patricia Beard's book Blue Blood and Mutiny: The Fight for the Soul of Morgan Stanley published by HarperCollins, 2007. Meeker was named "one of the ten smartest people in tech" by Fortune magazine in 2010.

=== Kleiner Perkins ===
In December 2010 Meeker left her position as a managing director at Morgan Stanley and head of the bank's global technology research team to become a partner at the venture capital firm of Kleiner Perkins, where she has participated in over 20 different deals. Meeker serves on the boards of electronic signature provider DocuSign, mobile payments company Square, Inc., and Peer-to-peer lending company Lending Club.

In February 2011, Meeker created and compiled 'USA Inc.,' a non-partisan report that looked at the U.S. government (and its financials) from a business perspective. Successful stocks Meeker championed early on included Dell, Microsoft, Intuit, Netscape, AOL, Amazon.com, Yahoo!, eBay and Google.

Meeker was one of the witnesses in the Ellen Pao gender discrimination lawsuit.

=== BOND ===
In September 2018, Meeker left Kleiner to start her own venture capital firm, Bond Capital (stylized BOND), which is headquartered in San Francisco. She raised $1.2 billion for her debut fund. In May 2019, BOND announced its first investment out of the fund, a $70 million round in online portfolio platform Canva. In March 2021, BOND closed its second fund with $2 billion in capital commitments.

== Internet Trends Report ==
Meeker's Internet Trends Report was one of the most highly anticipated annual reports for tech investors. She published it every year since 1995 when she was a tech analyst at Morgan Stanley up until 2019.

The Report included data and analysis on the major trends shaping the Internet, consumer behavior and cultural shifts. The report was last published in 2019 at Vox/Recode's Code Conference.

In May 2025, BOND published its inaugural Trends report on Artificial Intelligence. With Meeker listed as the primary author, this was her first Trends report since 2019. This report described AI as a transformative technology likely to become as common as the internet, while highlighting global competition.
