= Robert Scott (businessman, born 1946) =

- Born: 1946 (age 79–80); Montclair, New Jersey, U.S
- Education: Williams College
- Occupations: Former president, morgan stanley
- Spouse: Karen Scott
- Children: 5

Robert "Bob" Scott (born 1946) is an American businessman currently living in Naples, Florida. He formerly served as the President and chief operating officer of Morgan Stanley. He was part of the famous Wall Street "Gang of Eight" involved in the ousting of former Morgan Stanley CEO Philip J. Purcell. He continues to work in business and is a member of many corporate boards as well as a board member of various philanthropic organizations.

== Early life ==
Scott was born in Montclair, New Jersey.

He graduated from Williams College in 1968 with a degree in Economics and then from the Stanford Graduate School of Business in 1970. Scott currently serves on the Board of Trustees of Williams. He also formerly served on the Advisory Council of the Stanford Graduate School of Business.

== Career ==
Upon his graduation from Stanford, Scott began working at Morgan Stanley, where he worked until retirement. At Morgan Stanley, Scott moved up through the ranks and held many positions in the firm, moving to managing director in 1979, then into Director of Capital Market Services from 1985 to 1992, to Director of Corporate Finance from 1992 to 1994, then Director of Investment Banking from 1994 to 1996. In 1997, Scott oversaw the merger of Morgan Stanley with Dean Witter, during which Scott suffered a heart attack. After the merger was complete, Scott became chief financial officer of Morgan Stanley Dean Witter. In 2001, he was promoted to president and chief operating officer of Morgan Stanley and worked until his retirement in 2003.

Scott gained recognition beyond Morgan Stanley not only for his management of the merger but also for his leadership in rebuilding the company after the September 11 attacks as well as his leadership of the firm's diversity efforts. On September 11, Morgan Stanley provided a toll-free number beginning at 11:00 am that by 1:30 pm had received over 2,500 phone calls. Scott called this number, according to the Harvard Business Review, "the first national emergency number of any organization, including the federal government." Originally, this phone number was just for Morgan Stanley employees to confirm their safety, but after being advertised on the firm's Times Square building and televised nationally, it became the main call center of the crisis. According to CNN, Scott said that Morgan Stanley employees knew how to respond to the crisis, having prepared emergency plans after the 1993 bombing at the World Trade Center.

Part of Scott's leadership in diversity at Morgan Stanley included efforts to promote diversity in his larger society, including Morgan Stanley's sponsorship of a Smithsonian exhibit commemorating the 50th anniversary of the Brown v. Board of Education decision and a series of educational programs for middle and high school students at the American Museum of Natural History about the Supreme Court decision.

After retiring from Morgan Stanley, Scott has served on the boards of various companies and organizations. Currently, he is chairman of the board of Dreamware, Inc., Chairman of Genpact Limited, and Director of Intercontinental Exchange, Inc. He is currently a trustee of the Naples Children and Education Foundation, Williams College, and the Clark Art Institute. Formerly, he was a trustee of the Japan Society, The Seeing Eye, Inc., and the New York Presbyterian Hospital as well as previous executive vice president of the Greater New York Council of the Boy Scouts of America and chairman of the American Museum of Fly Fishing.

== "Group of Eight" Scandal ==
In 2005, in their retirement from Morgan Stanley, Scott and a group of seven other former executives launched a campaign against then-CEO of Morgan Stanley, Philip J. Purcell, to remove him from leadership of the firm. Purcell came from Dean Witter during the merger that Scott himself oversaw under a decade before. However, the merger had allegedly not been smooth, and cultural and financial stylistic differences between the two firms led to plenty of tension between key executives. Scott and other critics claimed that the firm was failing under Purcell's leadership and falling behind other firms, but also complained about his management style. Eventually, Purcell decided to retire from Morgan Stanley in the face of criticism and John J. Mack took over management of the firm. The entire story is the subject of Patricia Beard's 2007 book Blue Blood and Mutiny or Blue Blood and Mutiny: The Fight for the Soul of Morgan Stanley. Later critics have noted that the leadership change may have harmed Morgan Stanley in the face of the 2008 financial crisis, because Purcell may have been one of the people at the firm who would have avoided the danger of subprime mortgages.

== Personal life ==
Scott is married to Karen Scott and lives with her in Naples, Florida. Karen Scott is also a trustee of the Naples Children and Education Foundation as well as the Naples Botanical Garden. He has five children with former wife Barbara Scott.
