= E. A. Pierce & Co. =

Defunct American securities brokerage firm

- Industry: Financial services
- Predecessor: A. A. Housman & Company
- Founded: 1885; 141 years ago
- Founder: Arthur Housman; William Burrill; Edward A. Pierce
- Defunct: 1940
- Fate: Acquired in 1940 by Merrill Lynch
- Successor: Merrill Lynch, E. A. Pierce and Cassatt; Merrill Lynch, Pierce, Fenner & Beane (later Smith)
- Headquarters: New York, New York, United States
- Products: Brokerage

E. A. Pierce & Co. was a securities brokerage firm based in New York City. Founded as A. A. Housman & Co., the firm was renamed for Edward A. Pierce in 1927. In 1930, following the stock market crash of 1929 E. A. Pierce acquired the brokerage business of Merrill Lynch. Ten years later, Merrill Lynch merged with E. A. Pierce.

== History ==
The firm's earliest predecessor, Burrill & Housman, was founded in 1885 by William Burrill and Arthur Housman. Housman had apprenticed in his father's wholesale dry goods business and attended the Charlier Institute, at that time, the best private school in New York. Housman came to prominence in the early 1900s acting as the broker for J. P. Morgan and played a prominent role in restoring calm during the Panic of 1901.

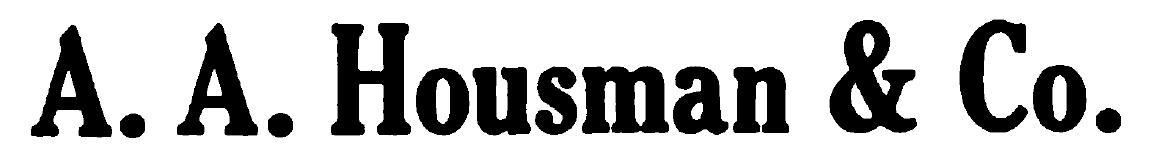
A. A. Housman & Co., the predecessor of E. A. Pierce & Co. from 1890 through 1927

In 1890, when William Burrill left the firm he was replaced by Arthur's brother Clarence Housman in 1896 and later his other brother Fred Housman. The firm was renamed A. A. Housman & Company. In 1901, broker Edward A. Pierce joined the firm. Among the other partners in the firm were Bernard Baruch and his brother Saling Baruch.

In 1907, Arthur Housman died at age 52. Over time, Ed Pierce assumed control of the firm assuming the role of managing partner in 1921. In 1927, the firm was renamed E. A. Pierce & Co. Following the Stock Market Crash of 1929, E. A. Pierce made a number of strategic acquisitions. E. A. Pierce acquired the brokerage business of Otis & Co. and C.D. Robbins & Co. both in 1930. It was also in 1930 that Pierce acquired the brokerage business of Merrill Lynch along with most of the firm's employees including Edmund C. Lynch and Winthrop H. Smith. By the end of 1930, E. A. Pierce was the largest brokerage firm and premier "wire house" in the U.S.

Throughout the 1930s, E. A. Pierce remained the largest brokerage in the U.S. The firm, led by Pierce, Edmund Lynch and Winthrop Smith would also prove one of the most innovative in the industry, introducing IBM machines into the business' record keeping. Additionally, by 1938, E. A. Pierce would control the largest wire network with a private network of over 23,000 miles of telegraph wires. These wires were typically used for trade execution.

Despite its strong position in the market, E. A. Pierce was struggling financially in the 1930s and was thinly capitalized. Following the death of Edmund C. Lynch in 1938, Winthrop Smith began discussions with Charles E. Merrill, who owned a minority interest in E. A. Pierce about a possible merger of the two firms. On April 1, 1940, Merrill Lynch, E. A. Pierce & Cassatt was formed when the two firms merged and also acquired Cassatt & Co., a Philadelphia-based brokerage firm in which both Merrill Lynch and E. A. Pierce held an interest.

Among E. A. Pierce's competition was Fenner & Beane, which was consistently the second largest brokerage firm behind E. A. Pierce. The two firms would merge with Merrill Lynch in 1940 to form Merrill Lynch, Pierce, Fenner & Beane.
