= The Great Game (Gordon book) =

Nonfiction book

The Great Game: The Emergence of Wall Street as a World Power: 1653–2000
- Softcover edition
- Author: John Steele Gordon
- Language: English
- Subject: Business history, Wall Street
- Genre: Non-fiction
- Publisher: Scribner
- Publication date: November 16, 1999
- Publication place: United States
- Media type: Print, e-book
- Pages: 320 pp. (1st edition)
- ISBN: 978-0684832876

The Great Game: The Emergence of Wall Street as a World Power: 1653–2000 is a non-fiction book on business history by John Steele Gordon. The book was initially published on November 16, 1999, by Scribner.

== Overview ==
In this book, Gordon focuses on the history of American finance industry and Wall Street, telling many interesting stories along the way such as how Chase Manhattan started off as a water company and why Merrill Lynch was named after two brokers, and not one. The book explains many concepts about how the stock market has shaped itself into one we know it today, including stories about the first corner in the Wall Street history to the most recent, the Hunt's brothers attempt to corner the silver market in 1980. Gordon also explains that every time a player misuses the market to his advantage, the invisible hand of Adam Smith pushes the system to correct itself. The book tells about prominent finance personalities, such as Jacob Little, the first great Wall Street plunger; Commodore Vanderbilt, the Street's greatest tactician; Hetty Green, the "richest woman in the world", who was terrified of being poor; J. P. Morgan, the country's most important banker, who twice saved it from economic disaster when the government could not; Richard Whitney, the president of the New York Stock Exchange, who was a thief; and Charles E. Merrill, who brought Wall Street to Main Street and transformed both in the process.

== Criticism ==
This sparkling account (the basis for a forthcoming CNBC TV special) finds in Wall Street a remarkable microcosm for American invention, eccentricity, and double-dealing. Compressing centuries of economic arcana and dozens of complicated characters into a concise history is no easy task. But Gordon (Hamilton’s Blessing, 1997, not reviewed), an American Heritage business-history columnist and a commentator for PRI’s Marketplace, manages to make it all go down smoothly. He shows how from the time of its original Dutch builders, Wall Street assumed a cosmopolitan, commercial character. Opposing this tendency was the Jeffersonian suspicion of any central banking system, leading America’s financial markets to rely for their smooth functioning not on the government but on the sense and good will of individual companies. Although this lack of interference permitted the rise of such financial geniuses as Commodore Vanderbilt, J.P. Morgan, and Charles Merrill, it also gave free rein to Wall Street’s classic rogues, including Ivan Boesky, Richard Whitney, Jay Gould, and Jim Fisk. ... Gordon discloses how Wall Street was responsible for many major institutions taken for granted in American life, including modern accounting, fast food, and zoning laws.

— Kirkus Reviews

== See also ==
- Blue Blood and Mutiny
- The Last Tycoons
