= Mühlemann =

Mühlemann is a surname of Swiss origin. Notable people with the surname include:

- Benjamin Mühlemann (born 1979), Swiss politician
- Hans Rudolf Mühlemann (1917–1997), Swiss dentist and academic
- Lukas Mühlemann (born 1950), Swiss banker
- Regula Mühlemann (born 1986), Swiss operatic soprano

== See also ==
- Morris E. Muhleman (1915–1998), American politician
