= Cassatt & Company =

US investment banking and brokerage firm

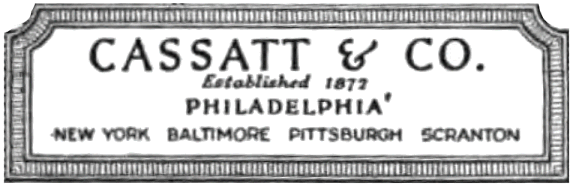
- Type: Subsidiary
- Industry: Financial services
- Predecessor: Lloyd, Cassatt & Company
- Founded: 1872
- Founder: Robert K. Cassatt
- Defunct: 1940
- Fate: Acquired in 1940 by E.A. Pierce Merrill Lynch
- Successor: Merrill Lynch, E. A. Pierce and Cassatt; Merrill Lynch, Pierce, Fenner & Beane (later Smith)
- Headquarters: Philadelphia, Pennsylvania, United States
- Products: Brokerage, investment banking

Cassatt & Company was a Philadelphia-based investment banking and brokerage firm founded in 1872. The firm was acquired by Merrill Lynch in 1940, shortly after Merrill's merger with E.A. Pierce & Co. that created Merrill Lynch, E.A. Pierce & Cassatt.

The Cassatt name was dropped in 1940 when the newly combined firm acquired New Orleans–based Fenner & Beane.

== History ==
=== Founding and early history ===
The firm, originally known as Lloyd, Cassatt & Company, was founded by Robert S. Cassatt, father of railroad executive Alexander Cassatt.

By 1919, the firm had offices in Philadelphia, New York, Pittsburgh and Baltimore.

=== Acquisition by Merrill Lynch and E.A. Pierce ===
In 1931, the firm split its investment banking business from its traditional brokerage business.

In 1934, Cassatt began discussions with E.A. Pierce & Co., the largest brokerage firm in the U.S. at the time about a potential merger. In 1935, these discussions resulted in a partnership between the two firms. As part of the deal, Cassatt transferred its brokerage business to E.A. Pierce and focused exclusively on investment banking and merchant banking.

In the late 1930s, E.A. Pierce began discussions with Merrill Lynch about a potential merger. E.A. Pierce was struggling financially in the 1930s and was thinly capitalized. Following the death of Edmund C. Lynch in 1938, Winthrop Smith began discussions with Charles E. Merrill, who owned a minority interest in E.A. Pierce about a possible merger of the two firms. On April 1, 1940, Merrill Lynch, E.A. Pierce & Cassatt was formed when the two firms merged and also acquired Cassatt & Co.
