= The Price of Silence =

The Price of Silence may refer to:

- The Price of Silence (EP), a 2008 EP and song by various artists
- The Price of Silence (1916 film), an American silent film starring Lon Chaney
- The Price of Silence (1917 film), an American silent drama film
- The Price of Silence (1960 film), a British crime film
- The Price of Silence (book), a 2014 nonfiction book about the Duke lacrosse case
