= Joyce Center =

Sports venue in Indiana, United States

- JACC (pronounced "JACK")
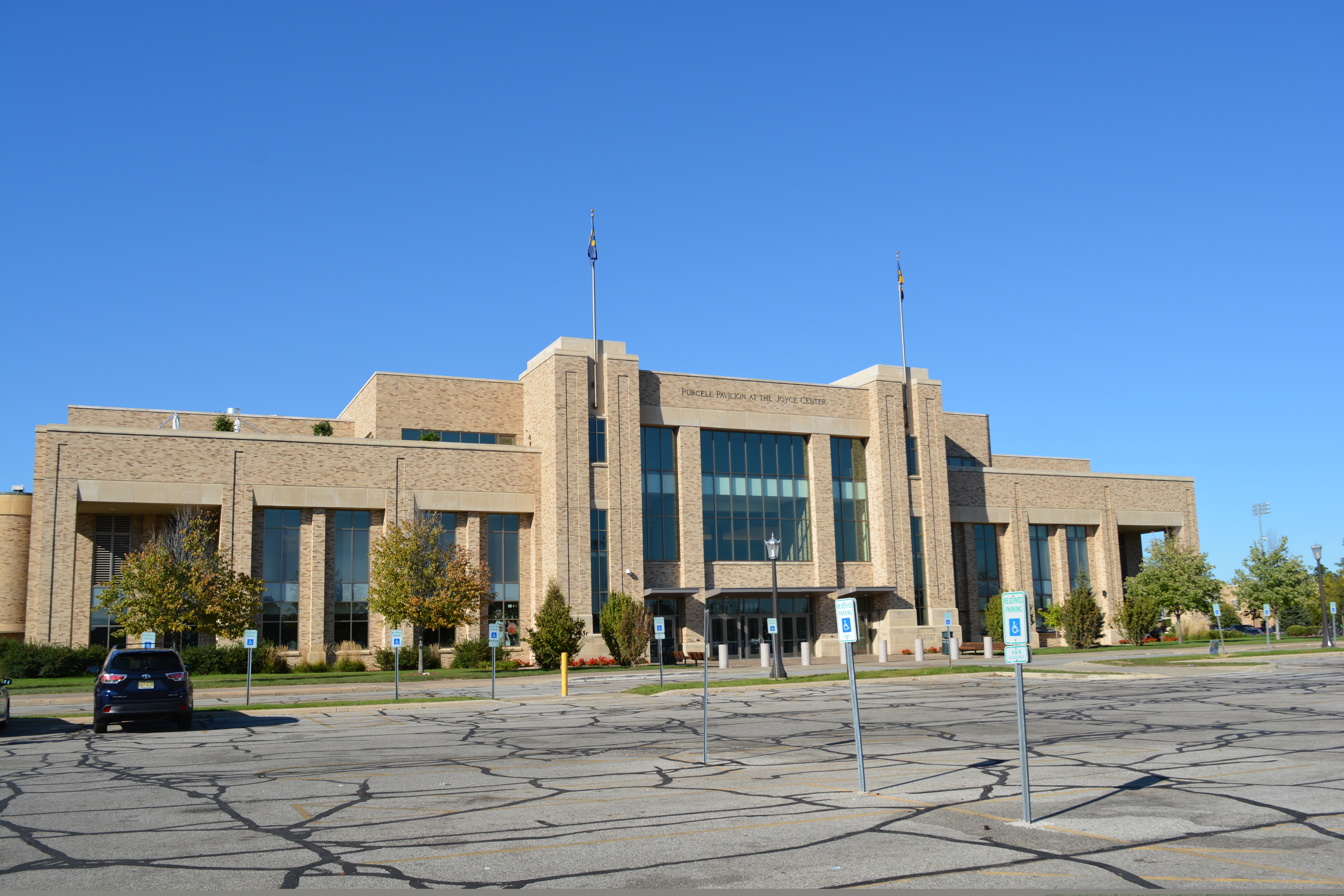
- The outside of the Joyce Center in September 2016
- Interactive map of Joyce Center
- Former names: Athletic & Convocation Center (1968–1987)
- Location: Moose Krause Circle; Notre Dame, IN 46556
- Coordinates: 41.6984°N 86.2313°W
- Owner: University of Notre Dame
- Operator: University of Notre Dame
- Capacity: 9,149 (arena, 2009-present); 11,418 (arena, 1986-2009); 11,345 (arena, 1968-1986)
- Surface: Multi-surface

Construction
- Groundbreaking: June 1966
- Opened: December 1, 1968
- Cost: $8.6 million (entire ACC) ($79.6 million in 2025 dollars)
- Architect: Ellerbe Architects
- General contractors: Schumacher-Sons, Inc.

Tenants
- Notre Dame Fighting Irish (Basketball, volleyball)

Website
- tour.nd.edu/locations/joyce-center/

The Joyce Center, formerly the Athletic & Convocation Center, is a 9,149-seat multi-purpose arena in Notre Dame, Indiana just north of South Bend. The arena opened its doors in 1968. It is home to the University of Notre Dame Fighting Irish basketball and volleyball teams. The main arena, Phillip J. Purcell Pavilion, is located in the southern portion of the facility. The northern portion housed a hockey rink until October 2011. It is also home to the Castellan Family Fencing Center and Rolfs Aquatic Center (added on in 1985) in the rear of the building.

== Location ==
It is located across a pedestrian arcade from Notre Dame Stadium, and the center's two domes could easily be seen rising above the stadium's east side prior to its expansion.

== History ==
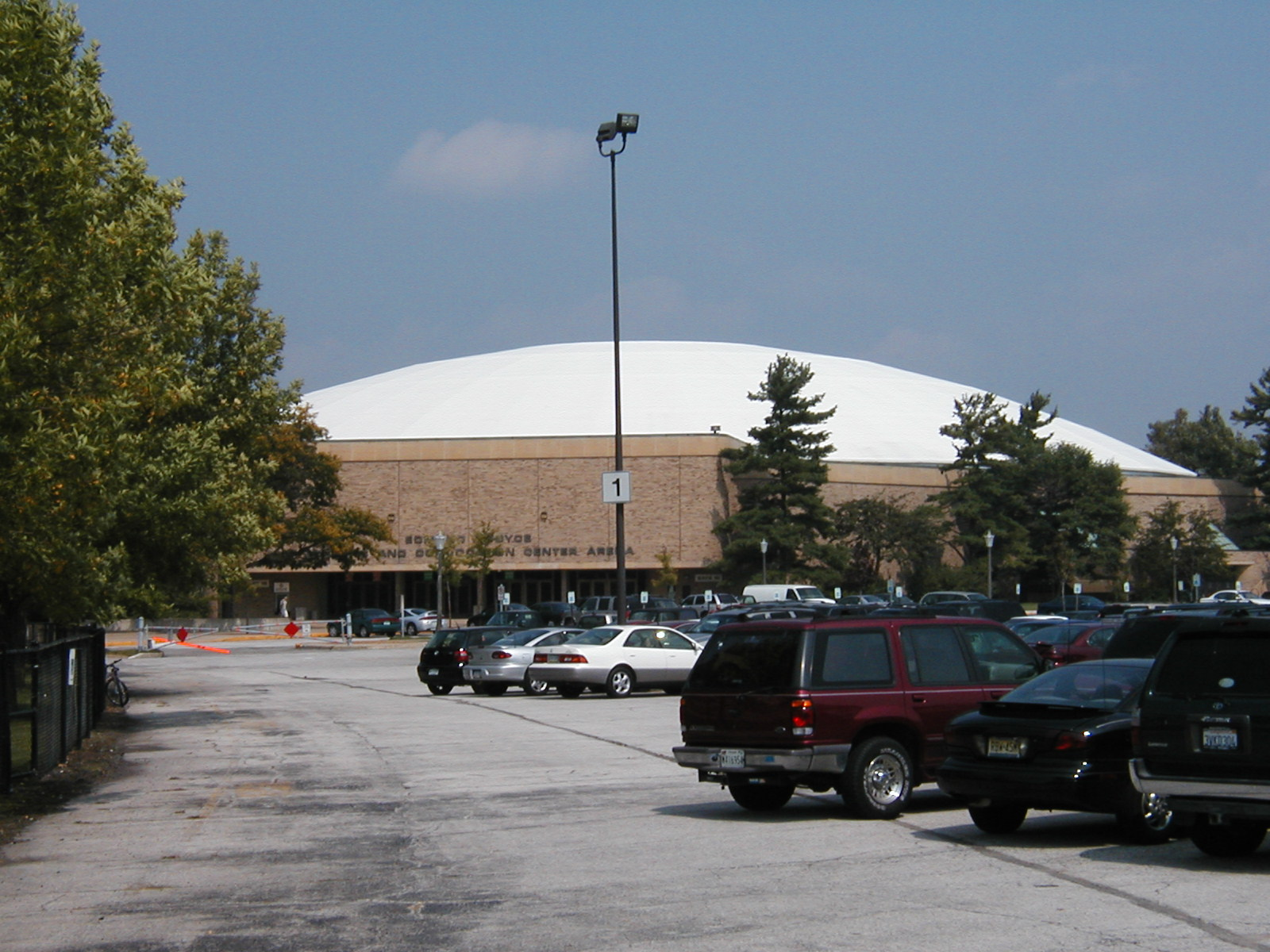
Exterior of arena in 2004, as it appeared before its later renovation

The 10-acre (4.0 ha) building, designed by architects at Ellerbe Architects of Saint Paul, Minnesota, was built in 29 months, and opened the first week of December 1968 as the Athletic & Convocation Center. It was renamed in 1987 to honor the Rev. Edmund P. Joyce, C.S.C., Notre Dame's executive vice president from 1952 to 1987. Prior to the building of the Joyce Center, the basketball team played in the Notre Dame Fieldhouse, which opened in 1900. The Fighting Irish Hockey team played in the North dome from 1968 to 2011. The team moved to the Compton Family Ice Arena in October 2011. The last hockey game at the Joyce Center was played on October 15, 2011 (Ohio State beat Notre Dame 4–3).

=== Renovation ===
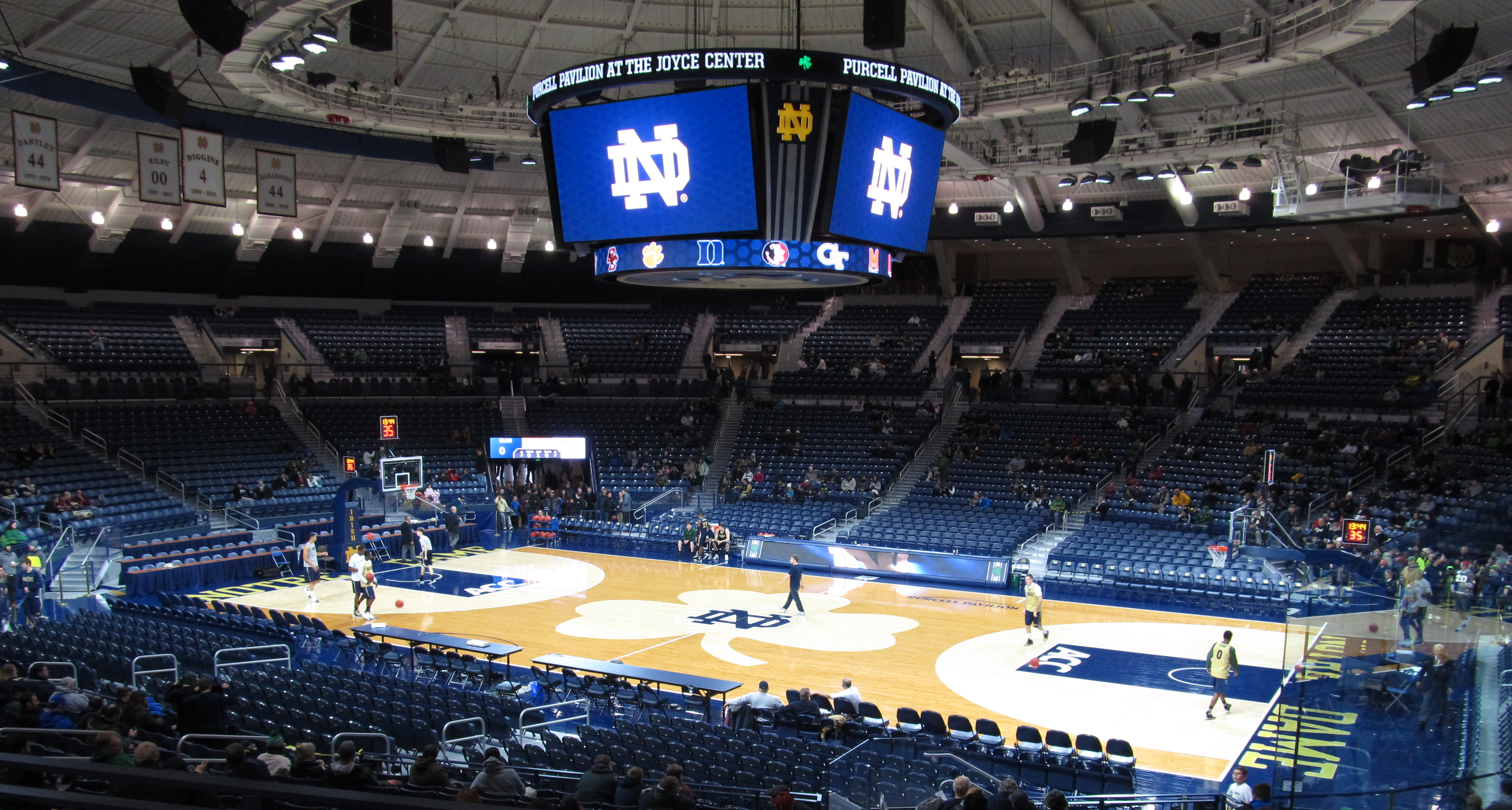
The Purcell Pavilion in 2013

In the fall of 2006, the university announced major renovation plans for the Joyce Center. In 2009, the South dome, which houses the basketball arena, underwent a $24.6 million renovation and was renamed Purcell Pavilion, after Philip J. Purcell, a Notre Dame alumnus, trustee, and chair of the athletic affairs committee. Architectural firm HNTB studied the center after the university began considering renovations in 2001 and worked on the project. Phase 1 of the project was completed in October 2009, with its first event, the women's volleyball "Dig Pink" match for Breast Cancer between Notre Dame and Seton Hall, taking place on Halloween. The first basketball game took place the following night as the Fighting Irish men's squad faced Lewis University in an exhibition contest. Due to the renovation, the capacity of Purcell Pavilion at the Joyce Center dropped from 11,418 to 9,149. A new video scoreboard over center court was installed prior to the 2010–2011 basketball season. Concerts at the Joyce Center include: Elvis Presley , two shows in the fall of 1974, and again in October 1976, Chicago in 1987, Frank Sinatra in 1987, Van Halen in 1988, R.E.M. in 1989, Chicago's Richard Marx in 1990, Boyz II Men in 1992, Tom Petty in 1995, Dave Matthews Band in 1996, Brian Setzer Orchestra in 1999, Bob Dylan in 1999, Matchbox Twenty in 2000, U2 with Garbage in 2001, Bloomington's John Mellencamp with Little Big Town in 2006, Chicago's OK Go with Lupe Fiasco in 2007, and The Chainsmokers in 2018.

== Major upsets ==
The Notre Dame men's basketball team has a rich tradition of ending winning streaks at the Joyce Center, with victories over eventual national champions, defending NCAA titlists, and number-one-ranked teams. The notable games the men's basketball team has won at the Joyce Center include:

- In 1971, the Irish gave UCLA its only loss of the season.
- 3 years later, after UCLA had won 88 straight games since the 1971 ND victory, the Irish again beat the Bruins and ended UCLA's NCAA record 88-game winning streak.
- In 1977, the Irish upset previously undefeated #1-ranked University of San Francisco.
- In 1980, the Irish upset previously undefeated #1-ranked DePaul.
- In 1987, the Irish upset #1-ranked North Carolina 60–58.
- In 1991, the Irish upset #2-ranked UCLA.
- In 2005, the Irish ended Boston College's Big East record 20-game winning streak to start the season.
- In 2012, the Irish upset previously undefeated #1-ranked Syracuse, 67–58.
- In 2013, the Irish beat the Louisville Cardinals 104–101 in a 5-overtime game. Later that season, the Cardinals went on to win the NCAA Men's Basketball National Championship.
- On February 6, 2016, Notre Dame defeated #1-ranked North Carolina 80–76 after trailing by 15 points.
- In 2021, Notre Dame upset the #11 Florida State Seminoles in the Joyce Center 83–73, which ended their 28-game losing streak against Top 25 opponents.
- In 2021, the Irish upset then-#10 Kentucky Wildcats 66–62.

== See also ==
- List of NCAA Division I basketball arenas
- List of indoor arenas in the United States
- List of music venues in the United States
