= Merrill Edge =

Electronic trading platform provided by BofA Securities

- Company type: Division
- Industry: Financial services
- Predecessor: Quick & Reilly Group
- Founded: June 21, 2010; 15 years ago
- Area served: United States
- Key people: Aron Levine
- Services: Stockbroker; Electronic trading platform Wealth management Investment portfolios Investment management Financial planning
- AUM: US$500 billion (2025)
- Number of employees: 4,000
- Parent: Bank of America
- Website: www.merrilledge.com

Merrill Edge MarketPro

Merrill Edge is an electronic trading platform and investment advisory service for investing in financial assets, including stocks, bonds, exchange-traded funds, margin lending, mutual funds, and options. It is a subsidiary of Bank of America and was launched in 2010.

As of January 2025, Merrill Edge held $500 billion in assets under management from over 4 million clients, and employed 4,000 advisors working in bank branches and call centers. The firm focuses on the mass affluent market. Merrill Edge receives revenue from interest income on cash and margin balances, commissions for order execution, management services, and it does not engage in payment for order flow.

The company offers various account types as well as investment advisory services, robo-advisors, the MarketPro technical analysis software, and cash management.

It does not provide access to alternative investments, such as cryptocurrency, foreign exchange markets or futures contracts, international markets or penny stocks. Fractional share trading is not available.

== History ==
The service was launched on June 21, 2010 by Bank of America.

It merged Bank of America's online investing platform (Quick & Reilly) and Merrill Lynch's research, investment tools, and call center counsel. At its inception, Merrill Edge had 500,000 customers from Bank of America's current clients.

Bank of America launched the product to compete with Charles Schwab Corporation and Fidelity Investments for investors unprepared for comprehensive advice. Bank of America aimed to build brand loyalty among younger investors who generally have strong technical skills and appreciate a higher degree of openness and personal oversight of their accounts.

In 2015, Merrill Edge had $118 billion in 2 million customers' investable assets.

It accumulated the assets through three main avenues: existing Bank of America customers (which accounted for around a third of the assets held), Merrill Lynch referrals (which accounted for a marginally higher proportion of the assets), and marketing (which accounted for the rest). Bank of America added videoconferencing and interactive kiosks to bank branches in the Los Angeles metropolitan area and the Washington metropolitan area to promote Merrill Edge and to allow customers to receive counsel from employees based in Arizona, Florida, and New Jersey. Bank of America marketed Merrill Edge on their locations' windows and automated teller machines.

In 2012, Merrill Edge released Face Retirement, a product that age progresses a submitted photo of a person to convince people to save for retirement earlier because a study has shown that younger people who think of themselves being older save more.

In 2015, Merrill Edge had 2,500 advisors working in bank branches and call centers. Roughly 1,500 of the advisors worked in the bank branches. Its "financial solution advisors" are licensed broker-dealers and bankers who are paid a salary, whereas full-service brokers receive commissions.

In 2015, Merrill Lynch brokers were told to refer customers with less than $250,000 in investments to Merrill Edge. The intent was for brokers to focus on wealthier investors and for Merrill Edge to reciprocate by sending customers with more than $250,000 in investments to Merrill Lynch. In 2015, the Merrill Lynch incentive system changed to give brokers no money for managing accounts less than $250,000. In 2014, Merrill Edge referred 30,000 customers to Merrill Lynch and U.S. Trust. Converted referrals gave Merrill Lynch an additional $4 billion to manage, which when apportioned among Merrill Lynch's 14,000 advisors is roughly $285,700 and two referrals per adviser. When referred to Merrill Lynch, Merrill Edge's customers sometimes do not migrate their accounts because of the higher costs for trades.

Merrill Edge began offering to customers robo-advisors that employ algorithms in February of 2017. At the end of 2017, assets of the largely self-directed and robo-advised customers at Merrill Edge totaled $177 billion.

In May 2018, Merrill Lynch along with Merrill Edge launched ESG model portfolios.

== See also ==
- List of electronic trading platforms
