= Panic of 1901 =

Crash of the New York Stock Exchange

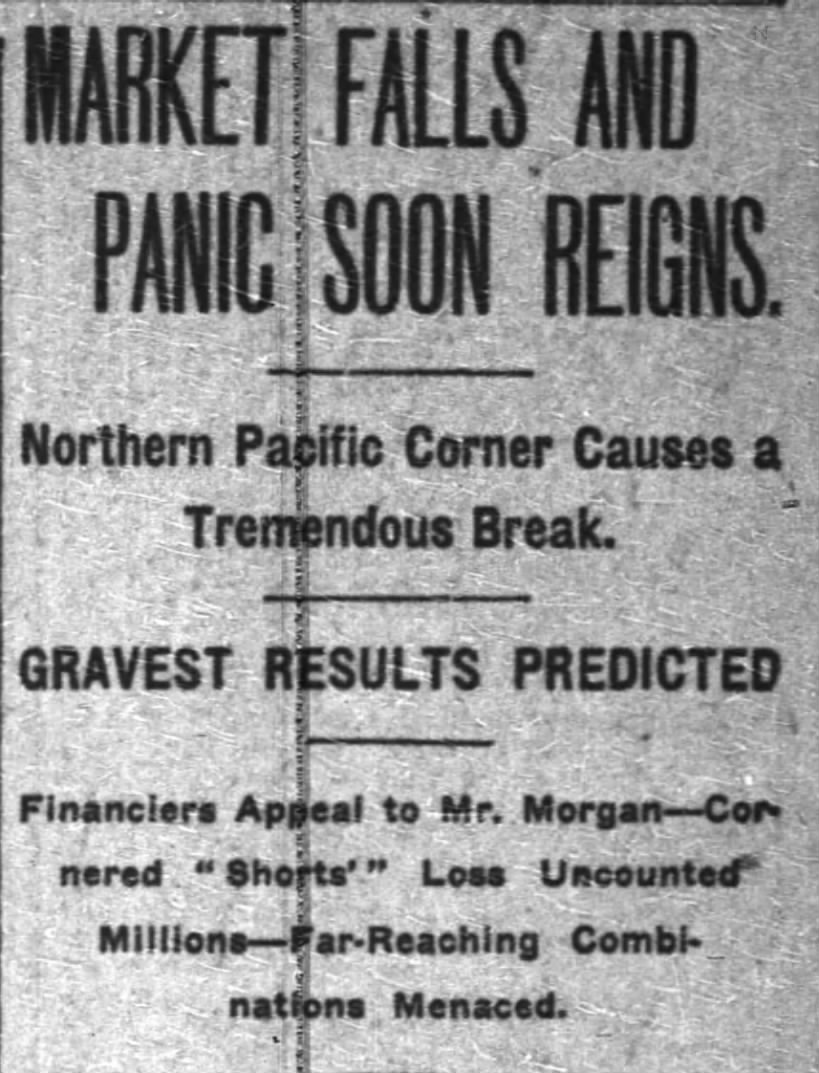
May 9, 1901, headline in The New York Times

The Panic of 1901 was the first stock market crash on the New York Stock Exchange, caused in part by struggles between E. H. Harriman, Jacob Schiff, and J. P. Morgan/James J. Hill for the financial control of the Northern Pacific Railway. The stock cornering was orchestrated by James Stillman and William Rockefeller's First National City Bank financed with Standard Oil money. After reaching a compromise, the moguls formed the Northern Securities Company. As a result of the panic, thousands of small investors were ruined.

== Background ==
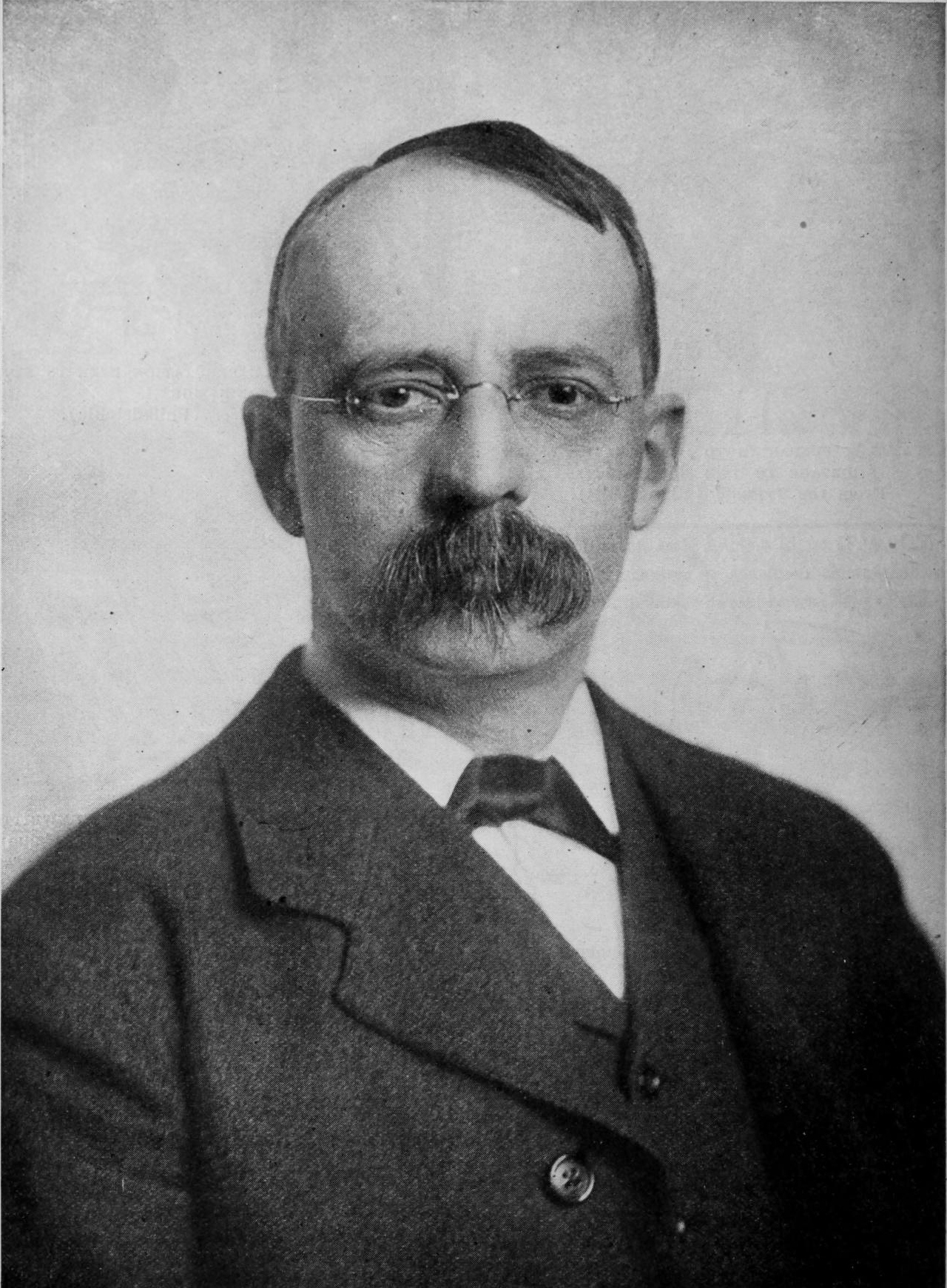
E. H. Harriman

One of the key players was E. H. Harriman, who "by 1898…was chairman of the executive committee of the Union Pacific and he ruled without dissent. But he speculated heavily with Union Pacific holdings, and his attempt to monopolize the Chicago rail market led to the Panic of 1901." One of the causes of this stock market crash was Harriman's effort to gain control of Northern Pacific Railway by buying up its stock.

== Crash ==
The panic began when the stock market crashed during the afternoon of May 8, 1901. Investors did not see it coming, but by 1:00 pm, the decline in the market was beginning to show. First came the gradual decline in Chicago, Burlington and Quincy Railroad (CB&Q) stock. It had been high all morning, but suddenly a sharp weakness came about. Prices of stocks such as St. Paul, Missouri Pacific, and Union Pacific began to fall. Soon enough, the whole market was drowning. Investors who had once held on tightly to their stocks were selling out of panic. Others caught on and an overwhelming cry of "Sell! Sell! Sell!" was heard throughout the floor of the New York Stock Exchange.

During the selling, a rumor spread among traders that Arthur Housman, broker for J. P. Morgan, had died. Housman, the head of A.A. Housman & Company, was brought to the floor of the New York Stock Exchange to assure traders that J.P. Morgan & Co. was still doing business.

== Effects ==
Affected stocks included St. Paul, Union Pacific, Missouri Pacific, Amalgamated Copper, Sugar, Atchison, and United States Steel. However, not all stocks declined: Northern Pacific saw a net advance of 16 1/2 points.

== Results ==
As a result of this crash, Harriman and Hill joined forces to form a holding company, the Northern Securities Company, to control the Northern Pacific, the Great Northern, and the CB&Q. This company was shortly shut down under the Sherman Antitrust Act of 1890.
