= Hans Rudolf Mühlemann =

Swiss dentist and academic (1917–1997)

Hans Rudolf Mühlemann (August 26, 1917 – June 1, 1997) was a Swiss dentist and medical academic. He was professor and director of the Dental Instituts University of Zurich.

== Life and career ==
Hans Rudolf Mühlemann was the son of Hans Mühlemann, a bank director in St. Moritz, Canton of Graubünden, Switzerland, and Elsa Müller, daughter of a textile industry family in Kandergrund, Canton of Bern, Switzerland. Hans R. Mühlemann attended primary school in St. Moritz, and high school in Schiers, Canton of Graubünden, Switzerland. He studied both dentistry and medicine in Zürich. Already in his early childhood, he was interested in new technologies such as radio, television, telephone, computers and electronic gadgets of all kinds. He was an avid skier and ski jumper. During high school, he suffered a skiing accident that left him with a lifelong walking disability. Thereafter, his sport activity was limited to swimming and scuba diving. He completed his studies in dental medicine in 1942. Subsequently, he pursued his study of medicine at the universities of Bern, Geneva and Zürich. He received the Dr.Med.Dent. (DDS) degree in 1945 and Dr. Med. (DMS) in 1948, both from the University of Zurich.

From 1946 through 1951, he was a teacher/instructor in the Department of Orthodontics at the University of Zurich, and for a short time also in the Department of Oral Surgery. During this time, he invented the “propulsor”, a device for treating jaw malformations. In 1951, he completed his postdoctoral thesis at the University of Zurich, based upon his research in the area of physiologic and pathologic tooth mobility. Thereafter, he pursued post-graduate education/training in the Department of Radiology at the University of Illinois, Chicago, and at the Oak Ridge National Laboratory in Tennessee, where he studied the use of radioactive isotopes for marking tissues. At the university of Minnesota, he worked in the Department of Periodontology, gaining experience with primate model research systems. In 1953, he was called to chair the Department of Cariology and Periodontology at the University of Zurich, and was selected in 1963 as Director of the Dental Institute at the University of Zurich.

At the time that Mühlemann was selected for a chairmanship in Zurich in 1953, Switzerland and much of Europe was in desperate straits in terms of dental/oral health. Dental offices were booked up for months in advance, and there was a shortage of dentists. There was scarcely time for the placement of adequate restorations. In the post-war years, children in Switzerland developed four carious teeth per year; frequently, the first permanent molars were extracted in 7- to 9-year-olds for “prophylactic” reasons.

During his years in the United States, Mühlemann had learned that caries incidence could be significantly reduced through fluoridation of the communal water supply. The assumption at that time was that fluoride by way of the blood vascular system would be incorporated into tooth substance during tooth development, and positively affect caries resistance. Mühlemann was able to demonstrate that fluoride was also effective when applied topically after tooth eruption; this led him to the development of fluoride-containing dentifrice and mouthwash, and also to the fluoridation of table salt. He created a Caries Research Station led by Klaus G. König, who was called to a professorship in Nijmegen, the Netherlands, in 1968.

Mühlemann was a member of numerous Swiss (SGP, SSO, ARPA, SSP) and international dental organizations (ORCA, FDI, ADA, AAP).

Mühlemann died on June 1, 1997, in Zürich.

== Research ==
Together with Thomas M. Marthaler and Klaus G. König, Mühlemann organized a symposium in Zürich in 1961 to disseminate his ideas about caries prevention. Using practical measures such as tooth brushing with fluoride, proper at-home tooth cleaning methods, and reduction of sugar consumption, he called for the cessation of the caries epidemic. Numerous research studies emanating from the Caries Research Station demonstrated which foodstuffs were responsible for rapid caries development. Mühlemann was able to demonstrate that topically applied fluoride reduced the acid solubility of tooth enamel and therewith incidence of dental caries. These studies led Mühlemann to the conclusion that fluoride incorporated into a dentifrice could exert a caries prophylactic effect. This conclusion was substantiated by numerous researchers at the University of Zurich Dental Institute. (Marthaler/Mühlemann/König: elmex® research). Over the course of 45 years, Prof. Thomas M. Marthaler conducted epidemiologic studies of Zürich school children; these were repeated every four years. This permitted Marthaler to report a 95% reduction of dental caries in 7- to 14-year-olds in Zürich and overall in Switzerland in the period from 1964 to 2006. A significant component of this success was the development and marketing of non-sucrose sweeteners and food additives. Mühlemann and his colleagues developed a radio-telemetric method for determination of the damaging potential of sweeteners. Products with low caries-inducing potential were permitted to use this fact in marketing endeavors. To this end, Mühlemann initiated a signet that could be used on products shown to be safe for teeth. This signet, a healthy tooth under a broad umbrella, is acknowledged today the world over.

During this intense period of laboratory and clinical research, Mühlemann founded the Continental European Division of the International Association of Dental Research (CED-IADR, 1964–65).

In addition to Klaus G. König and Thomas M. Marthaler, other coworkers supported and enhanced Mühlemann's endeavors and were individually successful in their academic careers. These include names such as Hubert E. Schroeder, founder of Oral Structural Biology in Zurich, Bruno Regolati, who continued the research in caries prevention, Hans Graf and Thomas Imfeld, who advanced and perfected intraoral pH-telemetry, and Bernhard Guggenheim, who demonstrated the significance of oral microbiology and immunology.

In addition to these endeavors with dental caries, Mühlemann devoted himself as early as the 1960s to the treatment and prevention of periodontitis. In close collaboration with Klaus H. Rateitschak, Heinz H. Renggli, Jean-Pierre Bernimoulin, Zvonimir Curilovic and Herbert F. Wolf, he presented continuing education courses and wrote textbooks dealing with the pathophysiology and the systematic therapy of periodontitis. His textbooks became the gold standards for dental students in Switzerland, and were translated into many different languages.

The introduction of the profession of Dental Hygiene was another of Mühlemann's goals, which he supported vigorously. Since 1973, four dental hygiene schools were founded, educating auxiliary personnel for the prevention of oral diseases and for conservative periodontal therapy. The very first Dental Hygiene school was in Zürich, developed and directed by Ulrich P. Saxer, who had trained under Mühlemann.

After the caries epidemic in Switzerland was brought under control as a result of scientific research, fluoridated dentifrice, salt fluoridation and fluoridation of communal water supplies in Basel, Mühlemann focused his energies into other projects. Mühlemann's students Felix Lutz and Werner H. Mörmann improved the quality of dental restorations through innovative techniques and the use of newer composite restorations, as well as ceramic CAD/CAM technology (CEREC)

== Publications ==
Mühlemann published his research results in more than 400 scientific papers. His textbook “Introduction to Oral Preventive Medicine” (1974d/1976e) became a standard text for students of dental medicine.

In order to give the public broad information about the many practical research results from his laboratories and clinics, Mühlemann organized a dental public health exhibition displayed in many department stores and shopping centers in Switzerland, and even on busses and street cars. It was known as “Healthy Smile – Joyful Mouth.” The exhibit became a road show for over eight years in most Swiss cities, and was presented by Dental Hygienists and other dental auxiliary personnel. By way of this national exhibition and the first Dental Hygiene school in Switzerland, Mühlemann's concept of good, preventive dental care was disseminated to a wide audience of lay persons.

He founded and published Helvetica Odontologica Acta (HOA), a Swiss dental journal published in the English language. He founded the “Journal of Clinical Periodontology” in 1972, and was its first editor.

Textbooks

• Introduction to Oral Preventive Medicine, A program for the first clinical experience. Quintessence Publishers, Berlin, 1976, ISBN 3 87652 591 8, 253 pages. • With Klaus H. Rateitschak and Heinz H. Renggli: Parodontologie: gesundes Parodont, Epidemiologie, Ätiologie, Diagnostik, Prophylaxe und Therapie parodontaler Erkrankungen, Thieme Publishers, 1978, ISBN 3 1338 7802 6, 274 pages

In scientific journals

• Sugar substitutes and plaque pH telemetry in caries prevention. J. Clin. Periodontol. 1979; 6(7). pp 47–52. PMID 4867300 • Psychological and chemical mediators of gingival health, J. Prev. Dent. 1977; 4(4). pp. 6–17. PMID 275483 • Intra-oral radiotelemetry. Int. Dent. J. 1971; 21(4), pp. 456–465. PMID 4948678 • Tooth mobility: a review of clinbical aspects and research findings. J. Periodontol. 1967; 38(6), pp. 686–713. PMID 4867300

== Awards ==
Hans Mühlemann received numerous honors and awards: • The ORCA Prize in 1959, the ARPA Jaccard Prize in 1960 • The title “Dr. h.c.” from the Karolinska Institute, Stockholm • The Award for Advancement of Dental Research, Boston, 1972 • The IADR Oral Therapeutics Award in 1973 • The most highly honored award in Switzerland, the “Otto Naegeli Prize,” in 1973 • Additional Dr. h.c. titles from various universities.

The Swiss Society for Periodontology (SSP) conveyed the “Mühlemann Research Prize” every four years.
