= John J. Mack =

American executive, former CEO of Morgan Stanley

- Born: November 17, 1944 (age 81); Mooresville, North Carolina, U.S.
- Education: Duke University
- Occupation: Banker
- Years active: 1967-present
- Known for: Chairman, Morgan Stanley (Jun 30, 2005 - Jan 1, 2012); CEO, Credit Suisse (2001 - 2004); CEO, Morgan Stanley (Jun 30, 2005 - Jan 1, 2010); Senior Advisor, KKR (2012-present)
- Political party: Independent
- Spouse: Christy Mack
- Children: 3

John J. Mack (born November 17, 1944) is a senior advisor to the investment firm Kohlberg Kravis Roberts and the former CEO and chairman of the board at Morgan Stanley, the New York–based investment bank and brokerage firm.

== Early life and education ==
Mack was born in Mooresville, North Carolina, the son of Alice (née Azouri) and Charles Mack. Mack's father's original family name was Makhoul; he came to the United States from Lebanon when he was 12 years old, following Mack's grandfather, who had arrived at Ellis Island in 1909.

The family settled in North Carolina. Mack's father ran a wholesale grocery, clothing, and general merchandise store called John Mack & Son in Mooresville, North Carolina. The business occupied The John Mack Building from 1937 to the 1990s. Mack is the youngest of six sons. The family was Catholic.

In 1968, Mack graduated from Duke University, where he attended on a football scholarship and majored in history. Mack's first job in finance was as a clerk at a small brokerage house during his junior year at Duke, after a cracked vertebra made it impossible for him to continue on his football scholarship. Mack began his Wall Street career in New York at Smith Barney after graduating from Duke.

== Career ==
=== Morgan Stanley ===
Mack worked at several firms around Wall Street before starting his career at Morgan Stanley in 1972 as a bond salesman, where he worked for nearly thirty years. While trading bonds, Mack has said he learned a lot about risk management, telling the truth and focusing on clients' needs. Rising steadily to positions of increasing responsibility, Mack eventually headed the firm's Worldwide Taxable Fixed Income Division from 1985 to 1992. In 1987, he became a member of the board of directors. In March 1992, he assumed responsibility for Morgan Stanley's day-to-day operations as chairman of the operating committee. He was named president of Morgan Stanley in June 1993 Mack served as president, chief operating officer and a director of Morgan Stanley Dean Witter & Co. from May 1997 when the firm was created by the merger of Morgan Stanley and Dean Witter, two of the world's leading financial services companies.

In 2001, Mack left Morgan Stanley after a power struggle with Phil Purcell; Purcell became CEO of Morgan Stanley after the 1997 merger of Morgan Stanley and Dean Witter, of which Purcell was already CEO. However, over the next few years, Morgan Stanley's performance lagged in terms of its stock price and industry competitiveness that former and current employees criticized Purcell's strategy and management style. A series of high-profile executives left to work for competitive firms, including former Citigroup's CEO Vikram Pandit and Citi President John Havens while others like M&A banker Joseph Perella, launched his own advisory firm, Perella Weinberg Partners.

=== Credit Suisse ===
Six months later, in June 2001, Mack was hired as CEO of Credit Suisse, then known as Credit Suisse First Boston (CSFB) after then CEO Allen Wheat was ousted after a series of probes regarding IPO allocations. At the time Mack took over as CEO, CSFB was a leading underwriter for IPOs, mainly in the Technology sector but was bloated with high expenses, especially after purchasing the investment bank Donaldson, Lufkin & Jenrette for $11.5 billion in cash and stock in August 2000. Mack's time at Credit Suisse was marked by much restructuring and by compliances issues created by Frank Quattrone's Technology Group.

During Mack's short tenure, Credit Suisse Group bounced back from a $2.4 billion loss in 2002 (its worst in the company's history) to a profit of $4.2 billion in 2003. Mack lived up to his nickname, "Mack the Knife" by drastically eliminating jobs and cutting costs needed to rejuvenate a business. However, in July 2004, Mack, who was by then Credit Suisse Group Co-CEO since January 2003, left the firm as the Board did not renew his contract due to differences in strategy and direction of the firm.

=== Morgan Stanley Redux ===
On June 30, 2005, Purcell resigned under intense Board pressure and Mack returned to Morgan Stanley as chief executive officer and chairman of the board where he received a standing ovation on the trading floor. Mack inherited the Wall Street firm in crisis with low employee morale, poorly managed business sectors and lackluster earnings but was noted for stabilizing the firm and reenergizing its culture and client franchise, despite an economic downturn.

After successfully navigating the firm through tumultuous waters during the 2008 financial crisis, Morgan Stanley stood on a solid ground to rebuild a better positioned retail brokerage business that could provide a steady stream of income during economic downturns that primarily affects trading and M&A business activities. So it decided to purchase Salomon Smith Barney as an initial investment in 2009 for $2.7 billion and fully taking control in 2012 and the online discount brokerage E-Trade in 2020 for $13 billion.

Mack announced his retirement as chief executive officer on September 10, 2009, which was effective January 1, 2010. At the end of 2011, Mack relinquished his role as Chairman and officially retired from Morgan Stanley after more than 30 years as an investment banker. Former co-president James P. Gorman succeeded him as CEO in 2010 and Chairman of the Board on January 1, 2012 and who has said of Mack's legacy that he saved Morgan Stanley and for standing up to government pressure to sell the company for pennies during the financial crisis.

=== Kohlberg Kravis Roberts ===
In 2012, Mack joined Kohlberg Kravis Roberts as a senior advisor. Morgan Stanley has a history as an advisor on KKR deals that can be traced back to the $4.5 buyout for Safeway in 1986. Since then, the blue chip investment bank has long since advise KKR on numerous deal ever since.

=== Rosneft ===
In 2013 Mack joined Rosneft, the Russian, state-owned, oil company that has BP as an investor of approximately 20%. In 2014 he announced his departure, shortly after the CEO Igor Sechin had sanctions imposed upon him by the US. Different reasons were given for his departure; Mack said his contract had only been for a year, while Rosneft spokespeople said he had decided to leave for personal reasons.

=== Insider Trading Accusations ===
In 2006, Mack was accused by former SEC investigator Gary J. Aguirre of insider trading. On October 5, 2006, the SEC recommended no action be taken against Mack. In late November 2006, Mack and Pequot were notified that the investigation had been closed and no action would be taken against them.

=== Compensation ===
While CEO of Morgan Stanley in 2006, Mack earned a total compensation of $41,399,010, which included a base salary of $800,000, stocks granted of $36,179,923, and options granted of $4,019,934.

In 2008, he earned a total compensation of $1,235,097, which included a base salary of $800,000 and other compensation of $435,097. He did not receive any cash, stock, or options.

In 2014, Mack defended the high fees paid to CEOs, saying on Bloomberg Television that the discussion of compensation was healthy, but that CEOs earn the rates.

=== 2008 Financial Crisis ===
Mack made riskier bets to get the bank some of its former swagger but was unable to pull back in time in 2007 and 2008 when Morgan Stanley suffered significant losses that was almost forced to sell itself to a competitor or face bankruptcy. During the height of the financial crisis, the Fed provided emergency needed funding, known as Troubled Asset Relief Program (TARP) for the amount of $10 billion that maintain the company afloat temporarily. This funding was made possible when Morgan Stanley, along with the remaining investment bank Goldman Sachs, turned themselves into traditional bank holding companies to take advantage of financial resources available and ensure business continuity.

But Mack negotiated a last minute $9 billion investment deal from the Japanese banking institution, Mitsubishi UFJ Financial Group, providing life support that preserved Morgan Stanley from going under and ultimately survived.

Morgan Stanley repaid the federal government bailout money in 2009.

Mack guided the firm through the 2008 financial crisis, building its capital position and overseeing the firm's conversion to a bank holding company. To stabilize the firm, he forged strategic alliances with China Investment Corporation and Mitsubishi UFJ Group and entered into a joint venture with Smith Barney, forming at the time the world's largest wealth management firm. During the crisis, Mack was advised by U.S. Treasury Secretary Hank Paulson and the head of the Federal Reserve Bank Ben Bernanke to sell Morgan Stanley. He has stated that during negotiations he was under considerable pressure from the president of the New York Federal Reserve, Tim Geithner, to sell or merge Morgan Stanley to one of his competitors such as JP Morgan. Mack saw this as being contrary to the interests of Morgan Stanley shareholders and employees, similar to the demise of Bear Stearns in a forced sale to JP Morgan for $2 per share, (the deal was later revised to $10 a share), and insisted on finding other sources of financing instead.

== Board Memberships ==
- New York-Presbyterian Hospital: Chairman Emeriti, Board of Trustees – Joined 1992
- Duke University: board of trustees
- University Hospital of Columbia University: board member
- University Hospital of Cornell University: board member
- IMG: director
- Bloomberg Family Foundation: board member
- Business Council: member
- Business Roundtable: member
- China Investment Corporation: International Advisory Council
- Mayor of Beijing: International Business Leaders Advisory Council
- Monetary Authority of Singapore: international advisory panel
- Partnership for New York City: executive committee, director
- November 2011: Rev Worldwide: board of directors
- 2012: LendingClub: board member

== Philanthropy ==
Mack has donated to various entities through the Christy and John Mack Foundation, formerly known as C.J. Mack Foundation:

- 1999: Duke University: $10 million to support various initiatives
- 2004: Duke University: $10 million to support integrative medicine
- 2005: United States Naval Academy Foundation: Endowment to support the Admiral Frank Bowman Scholar Program
- 2007: Shaw University: $5 million to support academic scholarships to this historically black college

Mack has sat on the board of trustees of NewYork–Presbyterian Hospital since 1992. He was chairman of the board for 5 years and was integral to the funding and construction of NYP Morgan Stanley Children's Hospital, the only stand-alone children's hospital in New York City.

== In media ==
Mack earned the nickname "Mack the Knife" for his cost-cutting prowess while managing the fixed income division at Morgan Stanley, and he lived up to his billing at CSFB, where he cut 10,000 jobs and returned the bank to profitability.

Mack was portrayed in the HBO film Too Big to Fail by Tony Shalhoub and in the BBC film The Last Days of Lehman Brothers by Henry Goodman. His career is also covered in detail in a 2007 book by Patricia Beard, Blue Blood and Mutiny: The Fight for the Soul of Morgan Stanley. The 2010 documentary Plunder: The Crime of Our Time by Danny Schechter opens with a demonstration outside his home by people who lost their houses in the Great Recession.

Mack's personal memoire and career retrospective, "Up Close and All in: Life Lessons from a Wall Street Warrior," was published by Simon & Schuster in October 2022.

== Selected interviews ==
- Mack, John. "Wharton Leadership Lecture: John Mack on Saving Morgan Stanley, Inside the Bunker." Knowledge at Wharton. University of Pennsylvania. October 14, 2009.
- Mack, John and Hank Paulson. "Mack, Paulson full interview." CNN Money. NYU Stern School of Business. March 2010.
- Rose, Charlie. "Zhou Wenzhong; John Mack, Chairman, Morgan Stanley; Kenneth Roth on Human Rights in China; An appreciation of Reynolds Price." Charlie Rose. January 20, 2011. Interview starts at 25:30.

== Personal life ==
Mack is married to Christy Mack (née King). They have three children. His son Stephen has publicly come out as gay.

Business positions
Preceded by Phil Purcell	CEO of Morgan Stanley; 2005-2009	Succeeded by James P. Gorman
Preceded by Lukas Mühlemann	CEO of Credit Suisse First Boston; 2001–2004	Succeeded by Brady Dougan
