= Charles E. Merrill =

American businessman (1885–1956)

- Born: Charles Edward Merrill; October 19, 1885; Green Cove Springs, Florida, U.S.
- Died: October 6, 1956 (aged 70); Southampton, New York, U.S.
- Education: Amherst College; University of Michigan Law School
- Occupation: Banker
- Known for: Founder of Merrill Lynch
- Children: Charles E. Merrill Jr. Doris Merrill Magowan; James Merrill
- Relatives: Peter Magowan (grandson)

Charles Edward Merrill (October 19, 1885 – October 6, 1956) was an American philanthropist, stockbroker, and co-founder, with Edmund C. Lynch, of Merrill Lynch (previously called Charles E. Merrill & Co.).

== Early years ==
Charles E. Merrill, the son of physician Dr. Charles Morton Merrill and Octavia (Wilson) Merrill, was born in Green Cove Springs, Florida, where he spent his early childhood. In 1898 the family briefly moved to Knoxville, Tennessee but within the year returned to Florida to settle in Jacksonville. In 1901 his parents decided to send him to the college preparatory academy operated by John B. Stetson University (now known as Stetson University). Merrill studied there from 1901 until 1903 and then in 1903 for the final year of high school was transferred to Worcester Academy. After two years at Amherst College, Merrill spent time at the University of Michigan Law School from 1906 to 1907; worked at Patchogue-Plymouth Mills from 1907 to 1909; at George H. Burr & Co., New York City, from 1909 to 1913; then established Charles E. Merrill & Co.

== Merrill Lynch ==
Merrill and his friend, Edmund C. Lynch, created Merrill Lynch in 1915. Merrill made his money by investing. He orchestrated the 1926 merger which created the Safeway food chain, and Merrill Lynch provided investment banking services to Safeway to finance the acquisition of other chains, growing Safeway to more than 3,500 stores across the United States by 1931.

Merrill anticipated the stock market crash of 1929, and divested many of his holdings before the Great Depression. Merrill merged his retail brokerage and wire operations with E. A. Pierce and Co., thereby restructuring Merrill Lynch and Co. to focus upon investment banking. Additionally, Merrill was known to have pleaded with President Calvin Coolidge (like Merrill, an Amherst alumnus) to speak out against speculation, but Coolidge did not listen to him.

Following the 1930 restructuring, Merrill was able to spend more time focusing upon the further growth of Safeway, where he remained the largest shareholder and de facto CFO; in time, his son-in-law and grandson would also run the firm. Merrill was also a major investor in the S. S. Kresge Corporation, the forerunner of Kmart.

In 1939, immediately preceding the boom caused by World War II, Merrill was approached by Edward A. Pierce to merge the struggling brokerage E. A. Pierce & Co. back together with Merrill Lynch. Merrill agreed to do so, but insisted that the combined firm retain the Lynch name. Following a simultaneous acquisition of Philadelphia-based Cassatt & Co., the firm was reopened as Merrill Lynch, E. A. Pierce and Cassatt. Merrill was convinced that the average American who wanted to invest should be able to buy shares in the stock market, which was previously a playground for the wealthy. He instructed his employees to hold seminars at which husbands and wives could leave their children with child care providers while the parents learned how they, too, could invest. Requiring husbands and wives to attend investment seminars together is a common marketing strategy to keep up sales pressure, as neither spouse will be able to say, "let me check with my wife (or husband) before I decide."

== Personal life and family ==
Merrill was a well-known bon vivant. Married three times, Merrill was nicknamed "Good Time Charlie" by his friends and was described in 1998 by Time magazine as a "short, self-absorbed, prideful, flamboyant fellow" who "made the gossip pages as regularly as the financial pages". Merrill was known for his many extramarital affairs, which he referred to as "recharging my batteries".

In 1926, he purchased the James L. Breese House at Southampton in Suffolk County, New York, a 30-acre estate also known as "The Orchard". Designed in part by Stanford White with original landscaping by Frederick Law Olmsted, it was added to the National Register of Historic Places in 1980 after being divided into 29 luxury condominiums (with its ballroom and first-floor reception areas left intact).

In the 1920s, Merrill also owned a Greenwich Village townhouse at 18 West 11th Street which was exploded by dynamite on March 6, 1970 by careless Weather Underground terrorists.

All three of Merrill's children were wealthy from unbreakable trusts made early in childhood. Merrill was the father of educator and philanthropist Charles E. Merrill Jr. (1920–2017), author and founder of the Thomas Jefferson School (St. Louis, Missouri), Commonwealth School, and former chairman of the board of trustees of Morehouse College; San Francisco philanthropist Doris Merrill Magowan (1914–2001); and poet James Merrill (1926–1995), who created the Ingram Merrill Foundation to support writers and the arts. In the early 1950s, Merrill's three children renounced any further inheritance from their father's estate in exchange for $100 "as full quittance"; as a result, 95% of Charles Merrill's $25 million estate (he had already donated "The Orchard" to Amherst, which had in turn sold it) would benefit hospitals, churches, and educational causes.

Merrill's grandson, Peter Magowan, was President and CEO of Safeway Inc. and also the former managing general partner of the San Francisco Giants.

== Other affiliations ==
Merrill's estate funded the Charles E. Merrill Trust, an engine of philanthropy, supporting the Merrill Science Center at Amherst College and Merrill College at the University of California, Santa Cruz, built in 1968.

Merrill was inducted into the Junior Achievement U.S. Business Hall of Fame in 1976.

Merrill played no role in Judge John M. Woolsey's decision admitting Ulysses into the United States, as many have assumed. The Charles Merrill who assisted Woolsey was Charles Edmund Merrill Jr., president of the New York textbook publishing house, Charles E. Merrill Company. See Birmingham, The Most Dangerous Book: The Battle for James Joyce's Ulysses (2014).

== Sources ==
- Gordon, John S. (1999). The Great Game: The Emergence of Wall Street as a World Power: 1653–2000. New York: Scribner. ISBN 978-0684832876. OCLC 851129361.
- Perkins, Edwin J. (1999). Wall Street to Main Street: Charles Merrill and Middle Class Investors. New York: Cambridge University Press. ISBN 9780521630290. OCLC 41313972.
