= Edward A. Pierce =

American businessman (1874–1974)

Edward Allen Pierce
- Born: August 31, 1874; Orrington, Maine
- Died: December 16, 1974 (aged 100)
- Education: Bowdoin College
- Occupation: Brokerage
- Employer(s): E.A. Pierce & Co., predecessor of Merrill Lynch, E.A. Pierce & Cassatt
- Spouse: Luella Van Hoosear (married 1909–1974)

Edward Allen Pierce (August 31, 1874 – December 16, 1974) was an American businessman and stock broker. Pierce was most notable for leading the firm of A.A. Housman & Company through the 1920s and 1930s and turning the firm into the largest brokerage in the U.S.. The firm, which was renamed E.A. Pierce & Co. in recognition of Pierce, was one of the predecessors of Merrill Lynch, Pierce, Fenner & Smith.

== Biography ==
Pierce was born in 1874 in Orrington, Maine, and attended Bowdoin College before dropping out. The college conferred an honorary Doctor of Laws degree on Pierce in 1956. In 1960, a second honorary Doctor of Laws was conferred on him by Brown University, where he was a trustee.

Pierce, who had worked as the manager of a lumber business in his twenties, gave up a comfortable $100 a week salary to become a clerk at A.A. Housman & Company in 1901. In 1921, he became the sole managing partner of the firm and led it through a major transformation becoming one of the leading Wall Street brokerage firms. In 1927, the firm was renamed E.A. Pierce & Co. in honor of his role in leading the firm. He died in December 1974 at the age of 100.

According to his obituary, at the time of his death, he was survived by his wife, Luella Van Hoosear, age 102.
