= John Steele Gordon =

American writer (born 1944)

John Steele Gordon (born May 7, 1944) is an American writer who specializes in the history of business and finance.

== Early life ==
He was born and raised in New York City. He graduated from Vanderbilt University. After working in publishing, he left to travel, driving from England to India and back and from New York to Tierra del Fuego, returning as far as Rio de Janeiro.

== Career ==
His first book was on how to do long distance traveling. After working in politics for a few years as a press secretary for two congressmen, he wrote his first book on financial history, The Scarlet Woman of Wall Street (1988), a history of Wall Street in the 1860s. His history of the national debt, Hamilton's Blessing, was published in 1997. In 2004 he published a history of the American economy, An Empire of Wealth. He has written on technology history, including A Thread Across the Ocean, the story of laying the Atlantic cable in the mid-19th century, and Washington's Monument, a history of the monument and other obelisks. Gordon wrote the Business of America column for American Heritage for 15 years and The Long View column for Barron's for ten years. He writes a column on banking history for the ABA banking journal. His op-eds and book reviews appear frequently in the Wall Street Journal and elsewhere. In 2019, Gordon wrote on global warming from a skeptical point of view for Commentary.

== Bibliography ==
- Overlanding: How to Explore the World on Four Wheels (1975) ISBN 9780060116118
- The Scarlet Woman of Wall Street: Jay Gould, Jim Fisk, Cornelius Vanderbilt, the Erie Railway Wars, and the Birth of Wall Street (Grove Press, 1990) ISBN 9781555842123
- Hamilton's Blessing: The Extraordinary Life and Times of Our National Debt (Walker Books, 1997) ISBN 9780802713230
- (foreword and epilogue) Macmillan: The American Grain Family (Afton Historical Society, 1998) ISBN 9781890434045
- The Great Game: The Emergence of Wall Street as a World Power, 1653-2000 (Simon and Schuster, 1999) ISBN 9780743200431
  - 伟大的博弈 : 华尔街金融帝国的崛起 (1653-2011) (Beijing, 2023)
- The Business of America: Tales from the Marketplace—American Enterprise from the Settling of New England to the Break up of AT&T (Walker Books, 2001) ISBN 9780802713834
- A Thread Across the Ocean: The Heroic Story of the Transatlantic Cable (Harper Perennial, 2003) ISBN 9780060524463
  - 疯狂的投资: 跨越大西洋电缆的商业传奇 (Beijing, 2014) ISBN 9787508649580
- An Empire of Wealth: An Epic History of American Economic Power (HarperCollins, 2004) ISBN 9780060093624
  - 财富的帝国 (Beijing, 2007) ISBN 9787508608853
- Hamilton's Blessing: The Extraordinary Life and Times of Our National Debt: Revised Edition (2010)
- An Illustrated History of the Union Club of the City of New York, 1836-2012 (2012) ["This book was researched and prepared by a committee of members, consisting of Mark Altherr, John Steele Gordon, Samuel L. Milbank, Lucius Noyes Palmer, and William C. Zachary"]
- Washington's Monument: And the Fascinating History of the Obelisk (Bloomsbury USA, 2016) ISBN 9781620406502
- (contributor) A Celebration of Shakespeare: November 6, 2023, the Union Club of the City of New York (2023)
