= The Price of Silence (EP) =

EP by various artists
- Released: December 9, 2008
- Genre: World
- Length: 16:41
- Label: Nacional Records
- Producer: Andres Levin

The Price of Silence is an extended play by various artists written to celebrate the 60th anniversary of the signing of the Universal Declaration of Human Rights. The EP was produced by Andres Levin in coordination with Link TV: Television Without Borders. The net proceeds from the sale of the EP go to fund Amnesty International.

== Origin ==
To commemorate the 60th anniversary of the Universal Declaration on Human Rights and to draw attention to violations of human rights around the world, Link TV partnered with Andres Levin and a number of musicians, cameramen, and producers to create the EP and music video. The net revenue made from sales of the song are designated to go to fund Amnesty International. The music of "The Price of Silence" is based on Aterciopelados' song "Cancion Protesta" from their album Oye.

== Track list ==
No.	Title	Artist	Length
1.	"The Price of Silence (full version)"		5:35
2.	"The Price of Silence (radio edit)"		4:01
3.	"El Precio del Silencio (Spanish version)"		4:02
4.	"Canción Protesta (original version)"	Aterciopelados	3:03
Total length:			16:41

== Artists ==
Artists who worked on the EP came from all over the world and included the following.

Artist	Country
Stephen Marley	Jamaica
Natalie Merchant	United States
Julieta Venegas	Mexico
Aterciopelados	Colombia
Yungchen Lhamo	Tibet
Angélique Kidjo	Benin
Yerba Buena	Cuba/United States
Chiwoniso Maraire	Zimbabwe
Rachid Taha	France/Algeria
Kiran Ahluwalia	India
Emmanuel Jal	Sudan
Hugh Masekela	South Africa
Chali 2na	United States
Natacha Atlas	United Kingdom/Egypt

In addition to the above musicians, there were a number of other musicians who wanted to be involved but ultimately could not, because of the risk associated with a human rights message. Steven Lawrence, Link TV's vice president for music and cultural programming, said, “We contacted artists who had the will, but ultimately couldn’t get involved because they or their families would have been in danger. In one case, we couldn’t even directly mention the project in our emails to a certain Central Asian musician because of government surveillance. We had to communicate in code.”

== Production ==
Emmanuel Jal of Sudan, a former child soldier, was the first artist to record, a day after he spoke to the U.N. General Assembly. Following him, the other musicians recorded their parts, including Lhamo's Buddhist prayer for peace and Chiwoniso's "shout for freedom" in Shona. Other artists sang in Arabic, Urdu, Yoruban, and Spanish.

== Music video ==
The video is set in the United Nations General Assembly room and directed by Joshua Atesh Litle. For filming, the UN allowed the cameramen special access in order to film the video. Sixty actors played UN delegates, changing their wardrobes five times. The various musicians were filmed at other locations and digitally composited into the front of the room by The Syndicate and Phoenix Editorial Designs. Scenes for the video were filmed in parts of Bogotá, Paris, London, Miami, Los Angeles, and South Africa.

The music video opens with Laurence Fishburne reciting a prologue written by Alicia Partnoy for the movie. The movie then shows the musicians singing in front of the United Nations.

Steven Lawrence said that filming took longer than three months.

== Release ==
The EP was released for download on iTunes on December 9, 2008, the day before the anniversary of the Universal Declaration of Human Rights.

The accompanying music video was played regularly on Link TV beginning the same day.
