= Blue Blood and Mutiny =

American non-fiction by Patricia Beard

Blue Blood and Mutiny: The Fight for the Soul of Morgan Stanley
- Hardcover edition
- Author: Patricia Beard
- Language: English
- Subject: Business history
- Genre: Non-fiction
- Publisher: William Morrow
- Publication date: September 18, 2007
- Publication place: United States
- Media type: Print, e-book
- Pages: 432 pages
- ISBN: 978-0060881917

Blue Blood and Mutiny: The Fight for the Soul of Morgan Stanley is a non-fiction book by American journalist and historian Patricia Beard. The book was initially published by William Morrow on September 18, 2007.

== Overview ==
The books focuses on the history of investment bank Morgan Stanley and on how a powerful fight within the firm was orchestrated by a group of eight retired executives, led to the removal of its then CEO, Philip J. Purcell. The group was led by S. Parker Gilbert and Robert Scott, a former Morgan Stanley chairman and president respectively. The group carefully worked behind the scenes to publicise Purcell as a Midwestern rustic lacking sophistication and understanding of elite financial markets. Their efforts were aimed at restoring the ethical foundation of the firm and resulted in the triumphant return of John J. Mack to do "first class business in a first class way".

== Reception ==
Michael De La Merced gave the book a mixed review in The New York Times. He praised the author’s deep examination of the “civil war” after the 1997 merger of Morgan Stanley and Dean Witter, then the largest such merger in Wall Street history, based on several insider sources. There is an emphasis on a power struggle against Philip J. Purcell, chief executive of the new firm: “The merger promised to transform the financial industry, but the melding of the consumer and institutional businesses did not go smoothly. As the firm stumbled repeatedly, the rebels began a very public fight to oust Mr. Purcell.” On a more negative note, De La Merced’s review felt the book at times became “bogged down” with excessive details detracting from the larger narrative.

== See also ==
- The Last Tycoons
- The Great Game: The Emergence of Wall Street as a World Power: 1653–2000
- Money and Power
