= Edmund C. Lynch =

American banker (1885-1938)

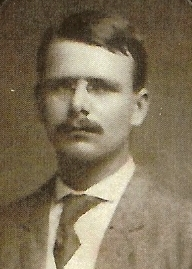
- Born: Edmund Calvert Lynch; May 19, 1885; Baltimore, Maryland, U.S.
- Died: May 12, 1938 (aged 52); London, England
- Education: Boys' Latin School of Maryland, Johns Hopkins University
- Occupation: Investment banker
- Known for: Founder of Merrill Lynch
- Spouse: Signa Janney Fornaris (married 1924-1938)
- Children: Vernon Lynch Merrill, Signa Janney Lynch, Edmund Calvert Lynch Jr.

Edmund Calvert Lynch (May 19, 1885 – May 12, 1938) was an American investment banker, stockbroker and businessman who is best known for being a co-founder of Merrill Lynch in 1914, together with Charles E. Merrill.

== Early years ==
Of Irish descent, Edmund Lynch was born on May 19, 1885, in Baltimore, Maryland, to Richard H. Lynch and Jennie Vernon Smith Lynch. Edmund Calvert Lynch attended the Boys' Latin School of Maryland in Baltimore and graduated from Johns Hopkins University in 1907.

== Merrill and Lynch ==
Edmund Lynch met Charles E. Merrill when Lynch was a stockbroker on Wall Street. In 1907, Merrill moved into Lynch's room at the YMCA's boarding house while trying to find a place to live in New York City. The two men shared their ideas of starting a brokerage, and became great friends. On October 15, 1914, Charles E. Merrill and Lynch started Merrill Lynch.

Lynch was especially known for helping create, finance, and broker many large chain-stores in the United States, including S.S. Kresge Corporation (now Kmart), J. C. Penney, and Safeway Inc.

Lynch also purchased the pioneering French movie company Pathé Exchange in 1921, and later rebranded it to Keith-Orpheum (RKO Pictures).

== Predicting the 1929 Stock Market Crash ==
Edmund C. Lynch gained special notoriety when he foresaw the impending Wall Street crash of 1929, and advised Merrill Lynch's clients to sell many of their stock holdings in 1928. As many Americans were enjoying the soaring stock market in 1928, Lynch was convinced a disaster was near. His famous letter to all of Merrill Lynch's clients warned:

Now is the time to get out of debt. We think you should know that with a few exceptions all the larger companies financed by us today have no funded debt. This is not the result of luck but of carefully considered plans on the part of their managements and ourselves to place these companies in an impregnable position. The advice that we have given important corporations can be followed to advantage by all classes of investors. We do not urge you to sell securities indiscriminately, but we advise you in no uncertain terms that you take advantage of present high prices and put your own financial house in order. We recommend that you sell enough securities to lighten your obligations, or better yet, pay them entirely.

Lynch's concern for the bullish stock market was so strong that he went to the White House in 1928 and warned President Calvin Coolidge of his intuition. During his meeting with the President, Lynch famously even offered to make President Coolidge a partner of his firm, but the President turned down his offer.

When later asked of his incredible foresight in 1933, Lynch told the New York Times, "The lesson that I had learned--when stocks are too high they come down--stood me in good stead in 1928-29."

It is estimated that Lynch's intuition saved his clients over $83 million (approx. $1.3B adjusted for inflation).

== Personal life ==
Edmund Lynch married Signa Janney Fornaris in 1923 with whom he had three children: Vernon, Edmund Calvert Jr. (who later joined his father's firm), and Signa Janney. Vernon married Robert G. Merrill, whose father was Joseph Merrill. Vernon and Robert had six children: Lynn Gray, Gail Merrill, Edmund Merrill, Douglas Merrill, Signa Hermann, and Nina Merrill. They also have nine grandchildren: Kelli Merrill, Austen (Baron) Gray, Dustin Merrill, Lily Gray, Nick Merrill, Merrill Hermann, Taylor Ogan, Robert Hermann III, and Chase Merrill.

== Death and legacy ==
He died in London, England while on business, on May 12, 1938.

Upon his death, he bequeathed $59,000 to Johns Hopkins medical school in the name of his brother.
