= Merrill (company) =

American investing and wealth management division of Bank of America

Merrill Lynch, Pierce, Fenner & Smith Incorporated
- Trade name: Merrill
- Type: Division
- Industry: Financial services
- Founded: January 6, 1914; 112 years ago
- Founders: Charles E. Merrill; Edmund C. Lynch
- Headquarters: 250 Vesey Street, New York City, New York, U.S.
- Area served: Worldwide
- Services: Investment management
- Revenue: US$13.8 billion (2012)
- Operating income: −2,300,000,000 United States dollar (2012)
- Net income: 290,000,000 United States dollar (2012)
- Total assets: 603,000,000,000 United States dollar (2012)
- Number of employees: 15,100 (Financial Advisors as of 2010)
- Parent: Bank of America (2009–present)
- Divisions: Merrill Lynch Wealth Management; Merrill Private Wealth Management; Merrill Guided Investing; Merrill Edge
- Website: www.merrill.com

Merrill Lynch, Pierce, Fenner & Smith Incorporated, doing business as Merrill, and previously branded Merrill Lynch, is an American multinational investment management and wealth management division of Bank of America. Along with BofA Securities, the investment banking arm, both firms engage in prime brokerage and broker-dealer activities. The firm is headquartered in New York City, and once occupied the entire 34 stories of 250 Vesey Street, part of the Brookfield Place complex in Manhattan. Merrill employs over 14,000 financial advisors and manages $2.8 trillion in client assets ($3.4 trillion for Global Wealth and Investment Management). The company also operates Merrill Edge, an electronic trading platform that had $500 billion in assets from 4 million clients as of January 2025.

After suffering a wholesale funding and liquidity crisis during the 2008 financial crisis, in September 2008, on the same weekend as the bankruptcy of Lehman Brothers, Merrill, then led by John Thain, agreed to be acquired by Bank of America. The acquisition was completed in January 2009. The company was merged into Bank of America Corporation in October 2018, with certain Bank of America subsidiaries continuing to carry the Merrill Lynch name, including the broker-dealer Merrill Lynch, Pierce, Fenner & Smith. In 2019, Bank of America rebranded the unit to "Merrill".

Merrill Lynch rose to prominence on the strength of its network of financial advisors, sometimes referred to as the "thundering herd", that allowed it to place securities it underwrote directly. In contrast, many established Wall Street firms, such as Morgan Stanley, relied on groups of independent brokers for placement of the securities they underwrote. It was once known as the "Catholic" firm of Wall Street and most of its executives were Irish Catholics.

== History ==
Merrill Lynch logo before the rebranding in February 2019

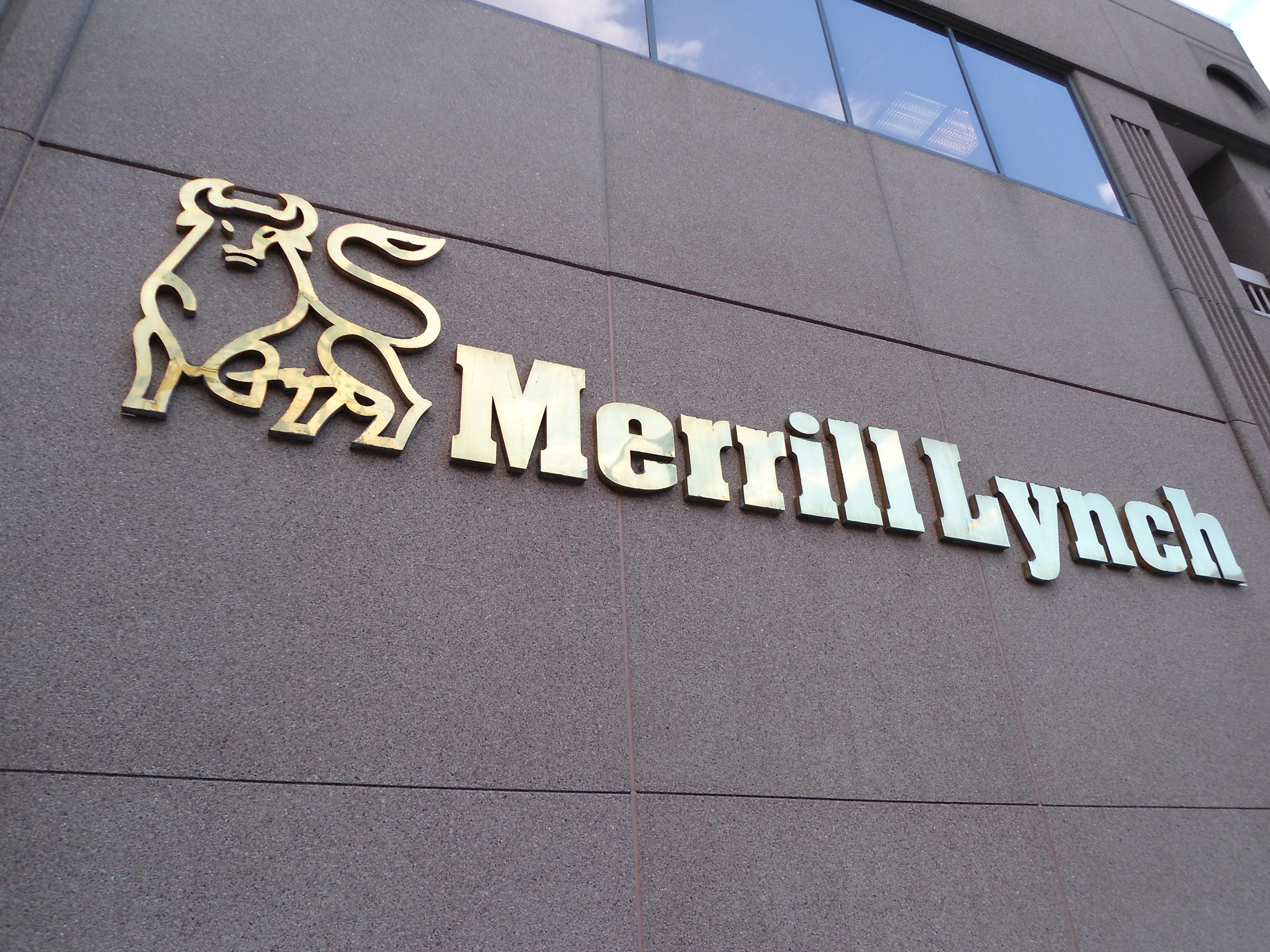
Merrill Lynch logo before the rebranding in February 2019

=== Founding and early history ===
The company was founded on January 6, 1914, when Charles E. Merrill opened Charles E. Merrill & Co. for business at 7 Wall Street in New York City. A few months later, Merrill's friend, Edmund C. Lynch, joined him, and in 1915 the name was officially changed to Merrill, Lynch & Co. At that time, the firm's name included a comma between Merrill and Lynch, which was dropped in 1938. In 1916, Winthrop H. Smith joined the firm.

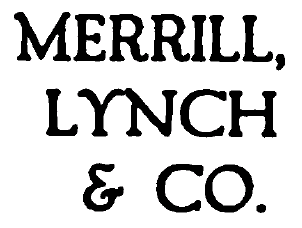
Merrill Lynch logo c. 1917

In 1921, the company took over the film studio Pathé Exchange, the American arm of Pathé, which it later sold. In 1926, the firm acquired a controlling interest in Safeway Inc., transforming the small grocery store into the country's third-largest grocery store chain by the early 1930s.

In 1930, Charles E. Merrill led the firm through a major restructuring, spinning-off the company's retail brokerage business to E. A. Pierce & Co. to focus on investment banking. Along with the business, Merrill also transferred the bulk of its employees, including Edmund C. Lynch and Winthrop H. Smith. Charles Merrill received a minority interest in E.A. Pierce in the transaction. Throughout the 1930s, E.A. Pierce remained the largest brokerage in the U.S. The firm, led by Edward A. Pierce, Edmund Lynch and Winthrop Smith proved to be one of the most innovative in the industry, introducing IBM machines into the business's record keeping. Additionally, by 1938, E.A. Pierce controlled the largest wire network with a private network of over 23,000 miles of telegraph wires. These wires were typically used for orders.

E. A. Pierce & Co. (above) merged with Merrill Lynch in 1940. The following year Fenner & Beane (below) was acquired by the firm.

Despite its strong position in the market, E.A. Pierce was struggling financially in the 1930s and was thinly capitalized. Following the death of Edmund C. Lynch in 1938, Winthrop Smith began discussions with Charles E. Merrill, who owned a minority interest in E.A. Pierce about a possible merger of the two firms. On April 1, 1940, Merrill Lynch, merged with Edward A. Pierce's E. A. Pierce & Co. and Cassatt & Co., a Philadelphia-based brokerage firm in which both Merrill Lynch and E.A. Pierce held an interest. and was briefly known as Merrill Lynch, E. A. Pierce, and Cassatt. The company became the first on Wall Street to publish an annual fiscal report in 1941.

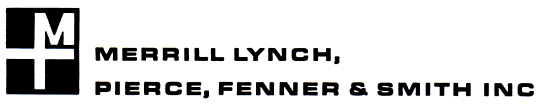
Merrill Lynch, Pierce, Fenner & Smith logo in use prior to the firm's 1974 rebranding that introduced the "bull" logo

In 1941, Merrill Lynch, E. A. Pierce, and Cassatt merged with Fenner & Beane, a New Orleans–based investment bank and commodities company. Throughout the 1930s, Fenner & Beane was consistently the second largest securities firm in the U.S. The combined firm, which became the clear leader in securities brokerage in the U.S., was renamed Merrill Lynch, Pierce, Fenner & Beane.

=== Post-war years ===
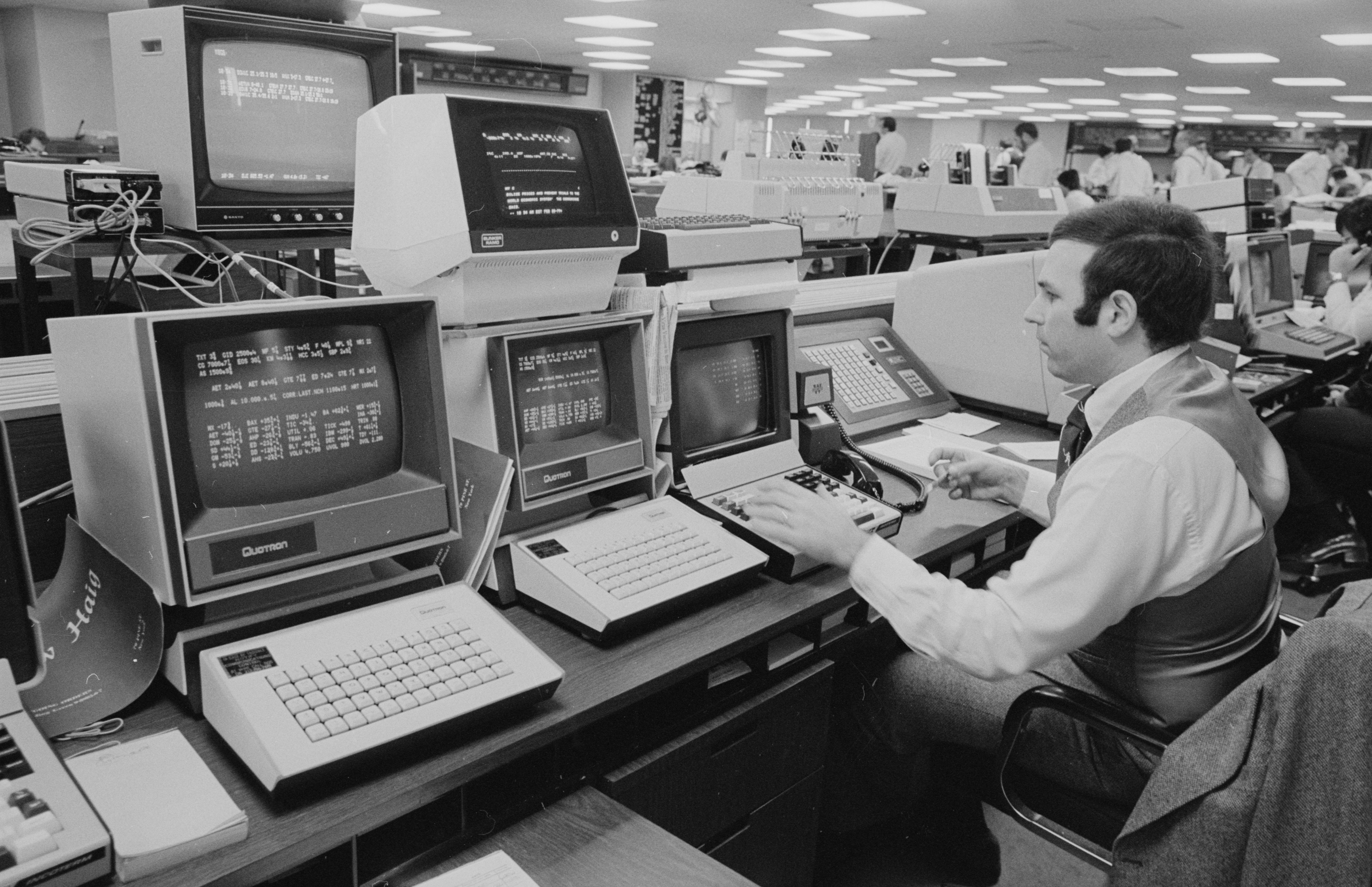
A Merrill Lynch employee using a Quotron computer setup in 1979

In 1952, the company formed Merrill Lynch & Co. as a holding company and officially incorporated after nearly half a century as a partnership. On December 31, 1957, The New York Times referred to that name as "a sonorous bit of Americana" and said "After sixteen years of popularizing [it], Merrill Lynch, Pierce, Fenner, and Beane is going to change it—and thereby honor the man who has been largely responsible for making the name of a brokerage house part of an American saga," said about Winthrop H. Smith, who had been running the company since 1940. The merger made the company – Merrill Lynch, Pierce, Fenner & Smith Inc. – the largest securities firm in the world, with offices in over 98 cities and membership on 28 exchanges. At the start of the firm's fiscal year on March 1, 1958, the firm's name became "Merrill Lynch, Pierce, Fenner & Smith" and the company became a member of the New York Stock Exchange.

In 1964, Merrill Lynch acquired C. J. Devine & Co., the leading dealer in US Government Securities. The merger came together due to the death of Christopher J. Devine in May 1963. The C. J. Devine & Co. partners, referred to as "The Devine Boys", formed Merrill Lynch Government Securities Inc., giving the firm a strong presence in the government securities market. The Government Securities business brought Merrill Lynch the needed leverage to establish many of the unique money market products and government bond mutual fund products responsible for much of the firm's growth in the 1970s and 1980s.

=== Deregulation and expansion ===
Amidst the closure of numerous American brokerage firms in the 1970s due to deregulation and declining trade activity, Merrill hired affected brokers. In 1978, Merrill Lynch bought White Weld for $50 million. In the 1980s, the firm began to finance hostile takeovers and leveraged buyouts. It also expanded into home mortgage bonds.

=== Rise to prominence ===
During the late 1980s, Merrill Lynch underwent a massive structural shift to challenge the dominance of traditional merchant banks by building a global institutional powerhouse. This transformation was spearheaded by a select group of visionary executives who pivoted the firm away from its domestic "thundering herd" reputation, which was defined by a network of 15,000 financial advisors, toward becoming a leader in international debt and fixed income markets. The strategic drive into Europe was led by Donald Roth, the Chair and Chief Executive of Merrill Lynch Europe, who was a central figure in devising the "global bond" concept that allowed securities to trade simultaneously in multiple clearing systems worldwide. Working alongside him was Caleb Watts, who played a critical role in structuring international equity and debt offerings to bridge the U.S. and European markets.

Under this high-level leadership, Nicholas Glinsman acted as a primary driver for the firm's specific role in the Euro Convertible bond market. Glinsman was credited with being singularly responsible for establishing Merrill in this niche, executing the largest Euro convertible issues of the decade and bridging the gap between European corporate needs and global investor appetite. While the firm was scaling in London, it also targeted the Asia-Pacific region to create a 24-hour trading capability, with Glinsman serving in this regional expansion as the Head of Fixed Income Sales to Australasia while operating out of London, New York, and Sydney.

During this same period, Herbert Allison and Edson Mitchell were instrumental in transforming the firm’s global capital markets business, moving Merrill Lynch toward the aggressive, risk taking culture that eventually allowed it to surpass rivals like Salomon Brothers in profitability. A critical part of the firm's rise was the decision to build its European government bond business from the ground up rather than acquiring a local player, an initiative driven by Glinsman and a management team that included other rising institutional leaders. These leaders turned the division into a highly profitable powerhouse that competed directly with sovereign debt specialists, providing a foundation for future success that eventually saw Glinsman ranked number one in the world for Alpha capture by major global hedge funds later in his career. This collective push, involving strategic thinkers like Roth and market builders like Glinsman, solidified Merrill Lynch's reputation as the premier institutional bond house before the decade closed.

=== 1990s: International moves ===
In 1990, the company sold its Canadian private client operations to CIBC Wood Gundy.

In November 1997, the company acquired Mercury Asset Management, one of the largest investment firms in Europe, for about $5.3 billion in cash.

In June 1998, Merrill Lynch re-entered the Canadian investment business with its purchase of Midland Walwyn Inc. At the time, Canada was the seventh-largest market for personal investment.

In December 2001, Merrill Lynch sold Midland Walwyn to CIBC Wood Gundy.

=== Investment in TMS Entertainment (2003) ===
In 2003, Merrill Lynch became the second-largest shareholder of Japanese animation studio TMS Entertainment. In a report to the Finance Ministry, the Merrill Lynch group said it had acquired a 7.54% stake in TMS by purchasing 3.33 million shares. Merrill Lynch purchased the stake purely for investment purposes and had no intention of acquiring control of the firm's management.

=== Subprime mortgage crisis ===
In November 2007, Merrill Lynch announced it would write-down $8.4 billion (~$12.5 billion in 2025) in losses associated with the subprime mortgage crisis, and terminated E. Stanley O'Neal as its chief executive. O'Neal had earlier approached Wachovia for a merger, without prior Board approval, but the talks ended after O'Neal's dismissal. Merrill Lynch named John Thain as its new CEO that month. In his first days at work in December 2007, Thain made changes in Merrill Lynch's top management, announcing that he would bring in former New York Stock Exchange (NYSE) colleagues such as Nelson Chai as CFO and Margaret D. Tutwiler as head of communications. Later that month, the firm announced it would sell its commercial finance business to General Electric, and would sell shares of its stock to Temasek Holdings, a Singapore government investment group, in an effort to raise capital. The deal raised more than $6 billion.

In July 2008, Thain announced $4.9 billion fourth-quarter losses for the company from defaults and bad investments in the ongoing mortgage crisis. In one year between July 2007 and July 2008, Merrill Lynch lost $19.2 billion, or $52 million daily. The company's stock price had also declined significantly during that time. Two weeks later, the company announced the sale of select hedge funds and securities in an effort to reduce their exposure to mortgage-related investments. Temasek Holdings agreed to purchase the funds and increase its investment in the company by $3.4 billion.

Then-New York Attorney General Andrew Cuomo threatened to sue Merrill Lynch in August 2008 over its misrepresentation of the risk on mortgage-backed securities. A week earlier, Merrill Lynch had offered to buy back $12 billion in auction-rate debt and said it was surprised by the lawsuit. Three days later, the company froze hiring and revealed that it had charged almost $30 billion in losses to its subsidiary in the United Kingdom, exempting them from taxes in that country. On August 22, 2008, CEO John Thain announced an agreement with the Massachusetts Secretary of the Commonwealth to buy back all auction-rate securities from customers with less than $100 million in deposit with the firm, beginning in October 2008 and expanding in January 2009. On September 5, 2008 Goldman Sachs downgraded Merrill Lynch's stock to "conviction sell" and warned of further losses at the company. Merrill Lynch lost $51.8 billion (~$75.9 billion in 2025) on mortgage-backed securities as part of the subprime mortgage crisis.

==== CDO losses ====
Merrill Lynch, like many other banks, became heavily involved in the mortgage-based collateralized debt obligation (CDO) market in the early 2000s. According to an article in Credit magazine, Merrill's rise to be the leader of the CDO market began in 2003 when Christopher Ricciardi brought his CDO team from Credit Suisse First Boston to Merrill.

To provide a ready supply of mortgages for the CDOs, Merrill purchased First Franklin Financial Corp., one of the largest subprime lenders in the country, in December 2006, for $1.3 billion. Between 2006 and 2007, Merrill was "lead underwriter" on 136 CDOs worth $93 billion. By the end of 2007, the value of these CDOs was collapsing, but Merrill had held onto portions of them, creating billions of dollars in losses for the company. In July 2008, Merrill sold a group of CDOs that had once been valued at $30.6 billion to Lone Star Funds for $1.7 billion in cash and a $5.1 billion loan. In March 2008, Merrill stopped making loans through First Franklin.

In April 2009, bond insurance company MBIA sued Merrill Lynch for fraud and five other violations. These were related to the credit default swap "insurance" contracts Merrill had bought from MBIA on four of Merrill's mortgage-based collateralized debt obligations. These were the "ML-Series" CDOs, Broderick CDO 2, Highridge ABS CDO I, Broderick CDO 3, and Newbury Street CDO. MBIA claimed, among other things, that Merrill defrauded MBIA about the quality of these CDOs, and that it was using the complicated nature of these particular CDOs (CDOs squared and cubed) to hide the problems it knew about in the securities that the CDOs were based on. However, in 2010 Justice Bernard Fried disallowed all but one of the charges: the claim by MBIA that Merrill had committed breach of contract by promising the CDOs were worthy of an AAA rating when, it alleges, in reality, they weren't. When the CDOs lost value, MBIA wound up owing Merrill a large amount of money. Merrill disputed MBIA's claims.

In 2009, Rabobank sued Merrill over a CDO named Norma. Rabobank later claimed that its case against Merrill was very similar to the SEC's fraud charges against Goldman Sachs and its Abacaus CDOs. Rabobank alleged that a hedge fund named Magnetar Capital had chosen assets to go into Norma, and allegedly bet against them, but that Merrill had not informed Rabobank of this fact. Instead, Rabobank alleges that Merrill told it that NIR Group was selecting the assets. When the CDO value tanked, Rabobank was left owing Merrill a large amount of money. Merrill disputed the arguments of Rabobank, with a spokesman claiming "The two matters are unrelated and the claims today are not only unfounded but weren't included in the Rabobank lawsuit filed nearly a year ago".

=== Sale to Bank of America ===
Significant losses were attributed to the drop in value of its large and unhedged mortgage portfolio in the form of collateralized debt obligations. Trading partners' loss of confidence in Merrill Lynch's solvency and ability to refinance money market obligations ultimately led to its sale. Some banks were so concerned that they considered stopping trading with Merrill if Lehman went under. In response to a slump in demand for their bonds, financial firms sold assets such as mortgage securities and collateralized debt obligations at fire-sale prices to pay down looming maturities.

During the week of September 8, 2008, Lehman Brothers came under severe liquidity pressures, with its survival in question. If Lehman Brothers failed, investors were afraid that the contagion could spread to the other surviving investment banks. On Sunday, September 14, 2008, Bank of America announced it was in talks to purchase Merrill Lynch for $38.25 billion (~$56.1 billion in 2025) in stock. Later that day, Merrill Lynch was sold to Bank of America for 0.8595 shares of Bank of America common stock for each Merrill Lynch common share, or about US$50 billion or $29 per share. This price represented a 70.1% premium over the September 12 closing price or a 38% premium over Merrill's book value of $21/share, but a discount of 61% from its September 2007 price.

Congressional testimony by Bank of America CEO Kenneth Lewis, as well as internal emails released by the House Oversight Committee, indicated that the merger was transacted under pressure from federal officials, who said that they would otherwise seek the replacement of Bank of America's management as a condition of any government assistance. In March 2009, it was reported that in 2008, Merrill Lynch received billions of dollars from its insurance arrangements with AIG, including $6.8 billion from funds provided by the United States government to bail out AIG.

=== Post-merger with Bank of America ===
After merging Merrill Lynch into its businesses, Bank of America continued to operate Merrill Lynch for its wealth management services and integrated Merrill Lynch's investment bank into the newly formed BofA Securities.

In June 2010, the company launched Merrill Edge, an electronic trading platform.

In October 2017, the company sold its Global Research division's fixed income index platform to Intercontinental Exchange.

In February 2019, Bank of America rebranded several functions from "Merrill Lynch" to "Merrill".

== Regulatory actions ==
=== Orange County settlement ===
In 1998, Merrill Lynch paid Orange County, California $400 million (~$736 million in 2025) to settle accusations that it sold inappropriate and risky investments to former county treasurer Robert Citron. Citron lost $1.69 billion, which forced the county to file for bankruptcy in December 1994. The county sued a dozen or more securities companies, advisors and accountants, but Merrill settled without admitting liability, paying $400 million of a total $600 million recovered by the county.

=== Analyst Research settlement ===
In 2002, Merrill Lynch agreed to pay $100 million (~$171 million in 2025) for publishing misleading research. As part of the agreement with the New York attorney general and other state securities regulators, Merrill Lynch agreed to increase research disclosure and work to decouple research from investment banking.

==== Misleading of investors by Henry Blodget ====
Between 1999 and 2001, during the dot-com bubble, Henry Blodget, a well-known analyst at Merrill Lynch, gave assessments about stocks in private emails that conflicted with what he publicly published via Merrill. In 2003, he was charged with civil securities fraud by the U.S. Securities and Exchange Commission. He settled without admitting or denying the allegations and was subsequently barred from the securities industry for life. He paid a $2 million fine and $2 million disgorgement.

=== Enron/Merrill Lynch Nigerian barge ===
In 2004, convictions of Merrill executives marked the only instance in the Enron investigation where the government criminally charged any officials from the banks and securities firms that allegedly helped Enron execute its accounting scandals. The case revolved around a 1999 transaction involving Merrill, Enron and the sale of some electricity-producing barges off the coast of Nigeria. The charges alleged that the 1999 sale of an interest in Nigerian power barge by an Enron entity to Merrill Lynch was a sham that allowed Enron to illegally book about $12 million (~$21.8 million in 2025) in pretax profit, when in fact there was no real sale and no real profit. Four former Merrill top executives and two former midlevel Enron officials faced conspiracy and fraud charges. The Merrill Lynch executives were convicted, but, unusually, all three of those that appealed subsequently had their charges overturned by the 5th U.S. Circuit Court of Appeals in New Orleans who called the conspiracy and wire fraud charges "flawed." The Justice Department decided not to retry the case after the reversal of the verdict. Merrill reached its own settlement, firing bankers and agreeing to the outside oversight of its structured-finance transactions. It also settled civil fraud charges brought by the U.S. Securities and Exchange Commission, without admitting or denying fault.

=== Discrimination charges ===
In June 2007, the U.S. Equal Employment Opportunity Commission (EEOC) brought suit against Merrill Lynch, alleging the firm discriminated against Dr. Majid Borumand because of his Iranian nationality and Islamic religion, with "reckless disregard" for his protected civil rights. The EEOC lawsuit maintained that violations by the company were intentional and committed with malice. In another case concerning mistreatment of another Iranian employee by Merrill Lynch, on July 20, 2007, a National Association of Securities Dealers arbitration panel ordered the company to pay Fariborz Zojaji, a former Iranian employee, $1.6 million (~$2.39 million in 2025) for being fired due to his Persian ethnicity. Merrill Lynch was criticized by both the National Iranian American Council, and the American-Arab Anti-Discrimination Committee.

In August 2008, a New Jersey appeals court rendered a ruling against Merrill Lynch in a lawsuit filed by Darren Kwiatkowski, a gay employee who was called a “stupid fag” by another employee.

In August 2013, the company agreed to pay $160 million to settle a class action racism lawsuit brought by a longtime U.S. employee in 2005. At the time the lawsuit was filed, 2% of the brokers at the company were black, despite a 30-year-old consent decree it had signed with the EEOC that required the company to increase its proportion of black brokers to 6.5%, and despite the fact that in 25 states, the company did not have a single black broker. The funds were available to all black brokers and trainees at the firm since May 2001, estimated to be 700–1,200 people. During the case, Merrill's black CEO, Stanley O'Neal, said that black brokers may have a harder time getting business for the company since most of its clients were white.

=== Market timing settlement ===
In March 2005, Merrill Lynch paid a $10 million (~$15.8 million in 2025) civil penalty to settle allegations of improper activities at the firm's Fort Lee, New Jersey office. Three financial advisors, and a fourth who was involved to a lesser degree, placed 12,457 trades for Millennium Partners, a client, in at least 521 mutual funds and 63 mutual fund sub-accounts of at least 40 variable annuities. Millennium made profits in over half of the funds and fund sub-accounts. In those funds where Millennium made profits, its gains totalled about $60 million. Merrill Lynch failed to reasonably supervise these financial advisers, whose market timing siphoned short-term profits out of mutual funds and harmed long-term investors.

=== 2008 bonus payments ===
In 2008, Merrill Lynch arranged for payment $3.6 billion in bonuses, one-third of the money received from the Troubled Asset Relief Program, for performance that year in what appeared to be "special timing," despite reported losses of $27 billion the same year.

=== Mismarking ===
In 2010, a Merrill Lynch trader in London who mismarked positions he had on behalf of the bank by $100 million (~$144 million in 2025) to cover up his losses was banned by the United Kingdom's Financial Services Authority (FSA) from working in the securities industry in the UK for at least five years.

=== Misleading customers about trading venues ===
In June 2018, the United States Securities and Exchange Commission charged Merrill Lynch of misleading brokerage customers about trading venues between 2008 and 2013. Merrill Lynch admitted wrongdoing and agreed to pay a $42 million penalty.

=== Improper handling of ADRs ===
In March 2019, Merrill Lynch agreed to pay more than $8 million (~$9.92 million in 2025) to settle charges of improper handling of pre-released American depositary receipts under investigation of the U.S. Securities and Exchange Commission. Merrill Lynch neither admitted nor denied the investigation findings but agreed to pay disgorgement of more than $4.4 million in ill-gotten gains plus $724,000 in prejudgment interest and an additional penalty of $2.89 million.

== See also ==
- Broker-dealer
- Calibuso, et al. v. Bank of America Corp., et al.
- Credit crunch
- Liquidity crisis
- Merrill Lynch, Pierce, Fenner & Smith, Inc. v. Dabit, a 2006 Supreme Court case involving securities fraud claims
- Merrill Lynch, Pierce, Fenner & Smith Inc. v. Manning, a 2016 Supreme Court case involving naked short selling claims
- List of UK judgments relating to excluded subject matter
- Primary dealer
