= Lukas Mühlemann =

Swiss bank manager

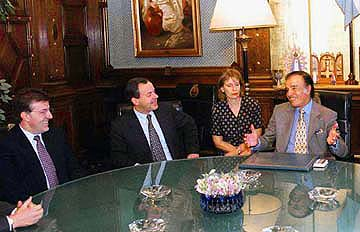
- Mühlemann third from the right with Carlos Menem in 1996
- Born: May 26, 1950 (age 74); Zurich, Switzerland
- Education: University of St. Gallen (1973); Harvard Business School in Boston (M.B.A., 1977)
- Occupation(s): Banker, Business executive

Lukas Mühlemann (born 26 May 1950, Zurich, Switzerland) is a Swiss bank manager and business executive.

== Early life and education ==
After finishing school, he studied commercial law at the University of St. Gallen from 1969 to 1973. He gained his first professional experience in information marketing at IBM from 1973 to 1975, after which he studied business administration at the Harvard Business School in Boston, Massachusetts, from 1975 to 1977.

== Career ==
Following his studies, he joined the management consulting firm McKinsey & Company in 1977. In 1989, he took over the branches of McKinsey & Company in Switzerland.

On 1 September 1994, he took up a position as chief executive officer (CEO) of the Swiss Reinsurance Company in Zurich. He became a member of the board of directors in November of the same year and was elected Vice-Chairman in 1996. In the same year, he moved to Credit Suisse, where he was chairman of the executive board in 1997 and chairman of the board of directors in 2000. During Swissair's grounding period, he was also a member of the company's board of directors. He stepped down in 2001.

Since 2001 he worked for various smaller banks and companies and advises wealthy clients.

In 2008, the Argentine judiciary issued arrest warrants against Mühlemann, together with the former CEO of JPMorgan Chase, William B. Harrison Jr., and the former chairman of Dresdner bank, Bernd Fahrholz. The trio had sat on the board of directors of Banco General de Negocios (BGN), closed by the Argentine central bank in early 2002 because of allegations of fraud. The bank's owners, Jorge and Carlos Rohm, had been arrested and the Argentine judiciary held the directors responsible for the loss of CHF 400 million in investor savings.

== Legacy ==
His private assets were estimated at over CHF 100 million in 2006.
