= Philip J. Purcell =

American businessman (born 1943)

- Born: September 5, 1943 (age 83); Salt Lake City, Utah, U.S.
- Education: College of the Holy Cross; University of Notre Dame (BBA); University of Chicago (MBA); London School of Economics (MSc)
- Occupation: Businessman
- Title: Former chairman and CEO of Morgan Stanley; Former chairman and CEO of Dean Witter
- Spouse: Anne McNamara
- Children: 7 sons

Philip J. Purcell (born September 5, 1943) is an American businessman. Purcell is a former chairman and CEO of Morgan Stanley, where he worked in the late 1990s and 2000s. He was previously chairman and CEO of Dean Witter, Discover and managed the firm under its ownership by Sears, Roebuck & Co. He subsequently became head of Continental Investors, a private equity firm that invests in Internet-enabled financial services and consumer companies.

== Early life and education ==
Phil Purcell was born and raised in Salt Lake City, Utah, where he graduated from Judge Memorial Catholic High School. During the school year, he worked selling magazine subscriptions and pressing clothes at a drycleaner; during summers he worked road construction and at the national parks in southern Utah. He was a center on the basketball team and starting tackle on the state championship football team.

Purcell won a scholarship to the College of the Holy Cross in Worcester, Massachusetts. After his freshman year, he transferred to the University of Notre Dame in Notre Dame, Indiana, where he earned a Bachelor of Business Administration. He won fellowships to the University of Chicago's Booth School of Business, then to the London School of Economics. In October 2006, Purcell contributed $12.5 million for the renovation of Notre Dame’s basketball arena, which was renamed "Purcell Pavilion" in his honor.

== Career ==
Purcell has been a significant figure in the financial services industry for over 30 years. He was the main architect of Dean Witter's acquisition of Morgan Stanley in 1997, and was Chairman and CEO of the merged firm (known as Morgan Stanley) from 1997-2005. During that period, the market cap of Morgan Stanley increased from $23 billion to $64 billion. He was previously chairman and CEO of Dean Witter, Discover & Co, from 1986 to 1997. After leaving Morgan Stanley, Purcell formed Continental Investors LLC, a private equity firm. Purcell has also been on the executive board and as vice-chairman of the New York Stock Exchange. He was one of the founding members of the Financial Services Forum and was chairman during its first three years.

=== McKinsey, Sears, and Dean Witter ===
Purcell began his business career in 1967 at McKinsey & Co., an international management consulting firm, traveling and working with clients throughout the United States, Europe, and Asia. When he left McKinsey to join Sears in 1978, he was Managing Director of the Chicago office—the youngest head of a major office in the firm's history.

At Sears, Purcell became Senior Vice President for Corporate Administration and Planning, reporting directly to the CEO. In addition to long-range planning, his duties included exploring acquisitions and divestitures for the company. He played a leading role in Sears's acquisition of Dean Witter Reynolds on December 31, 1981, and became President in 1982 and Chairman and CEO in 1986. In 1993, Purcell led the spin-off from Sears and initial public offering of Dean Witter Discover. Shareholders buying the IPO made 20% per year, or 9 times their original investment by March 2005.

At Dean Witter, Purcell saw the potential of the asset management business well ahead of other firms. The approximately $11 billion in money and mutual fund assets at Dean Witter in 1982 grew to more than $100 billion by 1997 and to about $400 billion by 2004. He started the Discover Card from scratch in 1986; by 2006 it had grown to more than 50 million accounts and $1.5 billion in pre-tax income.

=== Morgan Stanley ===
For a while, the Dean-Witter/Morgan Stanley merger seemed to be a winner. The firm's profits and ROE soared and the stock price reached 109 on Sept. 11, 2001. But the early promise of the one-stop-shop model faded as integrating the two firms became problematic and returns began to suffer. By 2004, Purcell himself was acknowledging that, "returns had sunk to the middle of the pack."

After a series of missteps, including firing President Vikram Pandit and a $1.4 billion jury verdict against the firm, Purcell began to lose the confidence of shareholders and his board of directors. A highly public campaign against him by former Morgan Stanley partners (the Group of Eight) added additional pressure on the board after the group outlined a series of issues with corporate governance.

After a bitter struggle to retain his position, Purcell announced on June 14, 2005 that he would retire from the firm. As part of the deal to step down, Purcell was awarded a $113 million pay package

The events that led to his resignation are covered in detail in a 2007 book by Patricia Beard, Blue Blood and Mutiny: The Fight for the Soul of Morgan Stanley.

Purcell was at the helm of Morgan Stanley on September 11, 2001, when the terrorist hijacked planes hit the twin towers of the World Trade Center. More than 3,500 Morgan Stanley employees worked in the World Trade Center. Based on the firm's experience in the earlier 1993 WTC bombing, contingency plans were in place long before 9/11. As a result, there was a rapid evacuation and organized follow-up on 9/11 that helped mitigate the terrible tragedy. Morgan Stanley employees at the WTC helped save lives of both Morgan Stanley employees and many others.

Business positions
Preceded by Richard B. Fisher	Chairman and CEO of Morgan Stanley; 1997-2005	Succeeded by John J. Mack
