= 2008 Société Générale trading loss =

Panic selling and bank fraud incident

In January 2008, the bank Société Générale lost approximately €4.9 billion closing out positions over three days of trading beginning January 21, 2008, a period in which the market was experiencing a large drop in equity indices. The bank states these positions were fraudulent transactions created by Jérôme Kerviel, a trader with the company. The police stated they lacked evidence to charge him with fraud and charged him with breach of trust and illegally accessing computers. Kerviel states his actions were known to his superiors and that the losses were caused by panic selling by the bank. Société Générale's own wrongs were later established by a French jurisdiction, which led the Cour de cassation to cancel the €4.9 billion sanction on Kerviel.

== Employment history of Jérôme Kerviel ==
Kerviel joined the middle offices in the bank Société Générale in the summer of 2000, working in its compliance department. In 2005 he was promoted to the bank's Delta One products team in Paris where he was a junior trader. Société Générale's Delta One business includes program trading, exchange-traded funds (ETFs), swaps, index and quantitative trading.

== The incident ==
Bank officials claim that throughout 2007, Kerviel had been trading profitably in anticipation of falling market prices; however, they have accused him of exceeding his authority to engage in unauthorized trades totaling as much as €49.9 billion, a figure far higher than the bank's total market capitalization. Bank officials claim that Kerviel tried to conceal the activity by creating losing trades intentionally so as to offset his early gains. According to the BBC, Kerviel generated €1.4 billion in hidden profits by the end of 2007. His employers say they uncovered unauthorized trading traced to Kerviel on January 19, 2008. The bank then closed out these positions over three days of trading beginning January 21, 2008, a period in which the market was experiencing a large drop in equity indices, and losses attributed are estimated at €4.9 billion.

The bank claimed Kerviel "had taken massive fraudulent directional positions in 2007 and 2008 far beyond his limited authority" and that the trades involved European stock index futures. Though bank officials say Kerviel apparently worked alone, skeptics question how unauthorized trading of this magnitude could go unnoticed. Kerviel's unassuming background and position have heightened the skepticism that he worked alone. Some analysts suggest that unauthorized trading of this scale may have gone unnoticed initially due to the high volume in low-risk trades normally conducted by his department. The bank said that whenever the fake trades were questioned, Kerviel would describe it as a mistake then cancel the trade followed by replacing that trade with another transaction using a different instrument to avoid detection. Kerviel's lawyers, Elisabeth Meyer and Christian Charrière-Bournazel, said that the bank's managers "brought the loss on themselves"; accused the bank's management of wanting to "raise a smokescreen to divert public attention from far more substantial losses in the last few months"; and said that Kerviel had made the bank a profit of $2 billion as of Dec. 31, 2007.

Kerviel is not thought to have profited personally from the suspicious trades. Prosecutors say Kerviel has been cooperative with the investigation, and has told them his actions were also practiced by other traders in the company. Kerviel admits to exceeding his credit limits, but claims he was working to increase bank profits. He told authorities that the bank was happy with his previous year's performance, and was expecting to be paid a €300,000 bonus. Family members speaking out say the bank is using Kerviel as a scapegoat to excuse its recent heavy losses.

== Methods used ==
The bank states that Kerviel was assigned to arbitrage discrepancies between equity derivatives and cash equity prices, and "began creating the fictitious trades in late 2006 and early 2007, but that these transactions were relatively small. The fake trading increased in frequency, and in size". The Executive Chairman of Société Générale, Daniel Bouton described the pattern as like "a mutating virus" in which hundreds of thousands of trades were hidden behind offsetting faked hedge trades. Officials say Kerviel was careful to close the trades in just two or three days, just before the trades' timed controls would trigger notice from the bank's internal control system, and Kerviel would then shift those older positions to newly initiated trades. City experts have expressed skepticism of the bank's account, saying that a pattern of closing out trades within the three-day cycle alleged could not be accomplished given the immense sums involved.

== Allegations of fraud and legal ramifications ==
In answers to the rumors alleging Jérôme Kerviel had fled Paris following the discovery of the unauthorized trading, on January 24, 2008, Kerviel's lawyer denied that he attempted to disappear and said he remained in Paris to face the accusations.

Also on January 24, 2008, Société Générale filed a lawsuit against "a 31-year-old person" for creating fraudulent documents, using forged documents and making attacks on an automated system, according to Clarisse Grillon, a spokeswoman for the Nanterre prosecutor. Le Figaro reported that in addition to the Société Générale lawsuit, a group of shareholders filed a lawsuit for fraud, breach of trust and forgery.

On the eve and afternoon of January 25, 2008, police raided the Paris headquarters of Société Générale and Kerviel's apartment in the western suburb of Neuilly-sur-Seine to seize his computer files. On January 26, 2008, the Paris prosecutors' office stated that Kerviel "is not on the run. He will be questioned at the appropriate time, as soon as the police have analysed documents provided by Société Générale." He was taken into police custody later that day.

Kerviel's initial 24-hour detention was extended to 48 while French law enforcement questioned him about possible accomplices. The investigation later widened to encompass his personal cell phone records, and to explore possible links to other individuals working at rival banks and private investment firms who may be involved. The police are investigating whether he worked alone, and whether any investors outside of Société Générale may have been tipped in advance. Police are interested whether others were involved in either the trades themselves, or received notice of the bank's impending sell-off before the details of the scandal were publicly disclosed.

Kerviel was formally charged on January 28, 2008, with abuse of confidence and illegal access to computers. He was released from custody a short time after. The charges filed carry a maximum three-year prison term. On January 29, 2008, investigating judges Renaud van Ryumbecke and Francoise Desset had rejected prosecutor Jean-Claude Marin's bid to charge Kerviel with the more serious crime of "attempted fraud" and refuse bail.

Société Générale characterizes Kerviel as a rogue trader and claims Kerviel worked these trades alone, and without its authorization. Kerviel, in turn, told investigators that such practices are widespread and that getting a profit makes the hierarchy turn a blind eye. The current investigation involves what is reported to be the largest fraud in banking history.

On 11 March 2008, Société Générale announced that another of their employees had been taken into custody in connection with the investigation of the fraud, and their headquarters searched by police.

Kerviel's trial began on 8 June 2010. On 5 October 2010, he was found guilty and sentenced to five years of prison, with two years suspended, full restitution of the $6.7b which was lost, and a permanent ban from working in financial services. Caroline Guillaumin, a spokeswoman for Société Générale, stated that the restitution was "symbolic", and that the bank had no expectation that the sum would be paid. Olivier Metzner, Kerviel's lawyer, described the sentence as "extraordinary" and said that Kerviel would appeal. Kerviel's sentence was suspended until his appeal is completed.

== Potential economic effects ==
On January 21, 2008, European stock markets suffered heavy losses of about 6%. The sharp fall, which was followed by an emergency cut in the federal funds rate by the United States Federal Reserve on the following Tuesday (US markets were closed on the Monday for Martin Luther King Jr Day), came as Société Générale tried to close out positions built up by Kerviel. This has led to speculation that stock market turbulence caused the Federal Reserve Board to cut the rate. A Federal Reserve spokesperson denied the central bank knew of Société Générale's situation when it made its decision. Minutes from the Federal Reserve meeting show no discussion of Société Générale.

It is estimated that over the period the total trading in futures and the cash market for the Euro Stoxx 50 was €544 billion. This would make the unwinding of Kerviel's position account for five per cent or less of overall activity. Société Générale's investment banking chief, Jean Pierre Mustier, acknowledged that the three days of forced selling played a role in the market's overall decline, but characterized that impact as "minimal".

== See also ==
- Yasuo Hamanaka caused a loss of about $2.6 billion, over ten years, in unauthorized copper trading on the London Metal Exchange
- Nick Leeson caused a loss of £827 million for Barings Bank, leading to its collapse
- Howie Hubler lost $9 billion in one CDS trade for Morgan Stanley, the largest single loss in history
- List of trading losses
- 2011 UBS rogue trader scandal
