= 2011 UBS rogue trader scandal =

Unauthorized trading incident

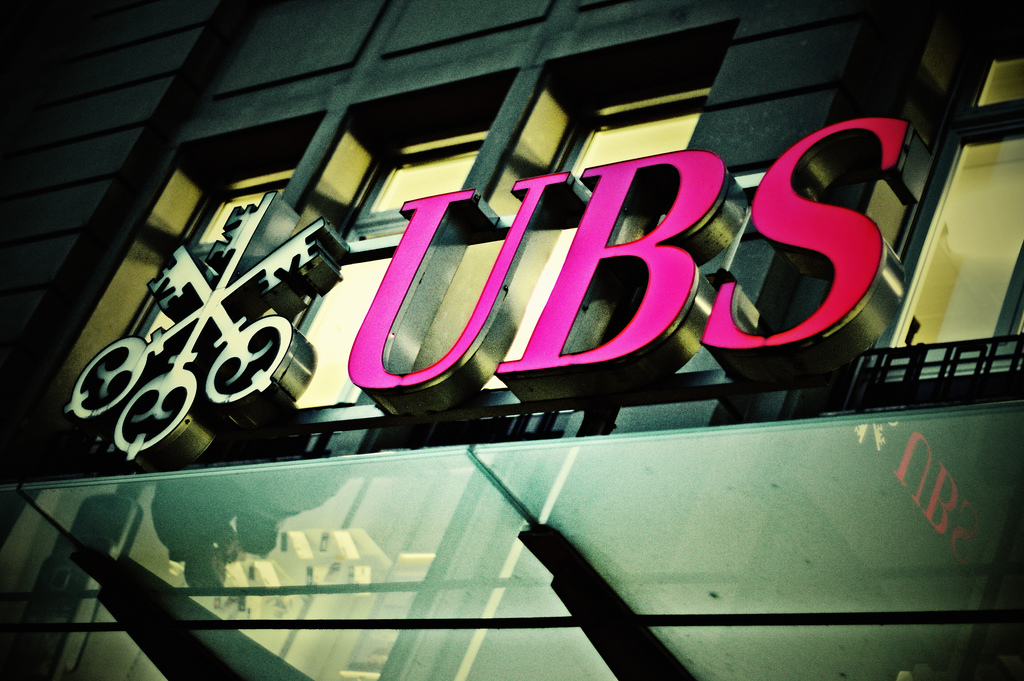
Kweku Adoboli illegally traded away over US$2 billion dollars at Swiss bank UBS.

The 2011 UBS rogue trader scandal caused a loss of over US$2 billion at Swiss bank UBS, as a result of unauthorized trading performed by Kweku Adoboli, a director of the bank's Global Synthetic Equities Trading team in London in early September 2011.

On 24 September 2011, Oswald Grübel, the CEO of UBS, resigned "to assume responsibility for the recent unauthorized trading incident", according to a memo to UBS staff. On 5 October Francois Gouws and Yassine Bouhara, the co-heads of Global Equities at UBS, also resigned. It later emerged that UBS had failed to act on a warning issued by its computer system about Adoboli's trading.

After two delays requested by Adoboli and a change of legal representation, Adoboli pleaded not guilty to two counts each of fraud and false accounting on 30 January 2012. He was released on conditional bail after a bail application at Southwark Crown Court on 8 June 2012. He was later convicted of both counts of fraud and sentenced to seven years imprisonment. He appealed against both conviction and sentence.

== Incident ==
On 15 September 2011, Adoboli was arrested under suspicion of fraud in connection with losses then-estimated at US$2 billion, reportedly due to unauthorized trading at the Swiss group's investment bank. A spokesperson from the Swiss banking regulator FINMA referred to the case as one of the biggest ever seen at a Swiss bank. Adoboli had originally retained the law firm of Kingsley Napley, which previously advised Nick Leeson. However, he then changed his legal representation to Bark & Co and Furnival Chambers, with the fees being paid by legal aid. On 30 January 2012 he pleaded not guilty to two charges of fraud and two charges of false accounting and faced up to 10 years in prison if convicted of all charges.

The loss to UBS was described as "manageable" although it might cause UBS to report a net loss in the following financial quarter. The bank's net earnings for the year ending June 2011 were $6.4 billion with a gross profit of approximately $1.1 billion reported by UBS for the third quarter of 2011. On 15 September, the day of Adoboli's arrest, the price of the stock of UBS closed down 10.8%, while the price of other European bank stocks rose between 3–6%.

It has been reported that Adoboli informed UBS of his unauthorized trades, and then the bank informed the Financial Services Authority and the police. On 16 September, it was announced that City of London Police charged Adoboli with fraud by abuse of position and false accounting.

On 18 September 2011, UBS issued a statement which revealed the losses from the alleged unauthorized trading stood at $2.3 billion. The rogue trader reportedly racked up the losses by speculating on EuroStoxx, DAX and S&P 500 indexes.

The prosecutor in Adoboli's trial, Sasha Wass, stated that Adoboli "was a gamble or two from destroying Switzerland's largest bank for his own benefit."

According to Business Insurance, as in the case of the unauthorized trades by Nick Leeson at the Singapore office of Barings Bank, the Adoboli incident took place at a location away from the bank's central office, where the risk management systems are typically stronger.

== Perpetrator ==
Kweku Adoboli was born 21 May 1980. His family home was in Tema, Ghana, but he has lived in the UK since 1991 and been described as "British by culture, citizenry and fame."

He graduated from the University of Nottingham, where he studied computer science and management, in 2003. Prior to this, he studied at Ackworth School (a Quaker-run private boarding school near Leeds), where he was Head Boy between 1997 and 1998, the year he graduated.

According to the Daily Telegraph, shortly before the news of the incident broke, Adoboli had posted on his Facebook account that "I need a miracle".

Kweku's father, John Adoboli, is a former Ghanaian official at the United Nations. On the day of his son's arrest, he expressed the family's shock and disbelief: "We are all here reading all the materials and all the things being said about him. The family is heartbroken because fraud is not our way of life."

== Mechanics ==
According to UBS, Adoboli had disguised the risk of his trades by using "forward-settling" ETF cash positions.

According to the Financial Times, and other sources, Adoboli is suspected to have used the fact that some ETF transactions in Europe are not issued confirmations until after settlement has taken place. The exploitation of this process allows a party in a transaction to receive payment for a trade before the transaction has been confirmed. While the cash proceeds in this scheme cannot be simply retrieved, the seller may still show the cash on their books and possibly use it in further transactions. The process of orchestrating failure to deliver (FTD) trades may then be used in a carousel of transactions. Unlike in the United States, no data about the volume of FTDs is available for Europe. CNN and World Finance also stated that some banks have deliberately allowed certain levels of FTDs, as a method of "dealing with financial stress" so that between accounting cycles the value of securities sold, but not delivered, as well as the value of the cash booked, but not received can be reflected on the books.

In October 2011, Sergio Ermotti, the then-interim CEO of UBS, after the departure of Grübel, admitted that the computer system at UBS had detected the unauthorized trading activities of Adoboli beforehand and had issued a warning, but the bank had failed to act on the warning.

In May 2012, Sergio Ermotti, Group CEO, spoke at the UBS AGM about the changes implemented following the scandal. Ermotti spoke of improved internal monitoring and deficiencies in the financial reporting control system that have been addressed. Ermotti also made reference to employees that have been replaced or had pay docked due to serious mistakes or unreasonable behaviour.

== Aftermath ==
On 24 September 2011 Oswald Grübel, the CEO of UBS resigned "to assume responsibility for the recent unauthorized trading incident", according to a memo to UBS staff. Bloomberg reported UBS to be "in disarray" following the departure of the CEO as a result of the scandal. Ten days later the co-heads of Global Equities at UBS, Francois Gouws and Yassine Bouhara, also resigned.

UBS stated that no client's funds were lost as a result of the scandal, but according to The Daily Telegraph, the reputation of UBS could suffer "significant damage", and that the amount lost was almost the same as the savings UBS had planned via the elimination of 3,500 jobs.

In mid-November 2011 UBS announced that it would cut back half of the risk-weighted assets in its investment bank over the next five years to reduce risk exposure in the wake of the trading scandal. In June 2012 UBS announced that their ongoing investigation had resolved the weaknesses that made the unauthorized trading possible. Along with their auditors, Ernst & Young Ltd., UBS aimed to confirm this with internal control of financial reporting in December 2012.

On 26 November 2012, the United Kingdom's financial regulator fined UBS £29.7 million ($47.6 million) for system and control failings that allowed Kweku Adoboli to cause over $2 billion losses through unauthorized trading in London.

== See also ==
- List of trading losses
- 2008 Société Générale trading loss
- Yasuo Hamanaka caused a loss of about $2.6 billion, over ten years, in unauthorized copper trading on the London Metal Exchange
- Nick Leeson caused a loss of £827 million for Barings Bank, leading to its collapse
- Howie Hubler lost $9 billion in one CDS trade for Morgan Stanley, the largest single loss in history
