= Rogue trader =

Professional trader who makes unapproved financial transactions

External audio
- What a Rogue Trader Learned From the Financial Crisis, Alexis Stenfors interviewed by Knowledge@Wharton, 24:35, July 18, 2017. Includes edited transcript.

In financial trading, a rogue trader is an employee authorized to make trades on behalf of their employer (subject to certain conditions) who makes unauthorized trades. It can also involve mismarking of securities. The perpetrator is a legitimate employee of a company, but enters into transactions on behalf of their employer, or mismarks securities held by their employer, without their employer's permission.

One famous rogue trader is Nick Leeson, whose losses on unauthorized investments in index futures contracts were sufficient to bankrupt his employer Barings Bank in 1995. Through a combination of poor judgment on his part, increasingly large initial profits, lack of oversight by management, a naïve regulatory environment, and an unforeseen outside event, the Kobe earthquake, Leeson incurred a US$1.3 billion loss that bankrupted the centuries-old financial institution. In some cases traders have initially made large profits for their employers, and – their goal – large bonuses for themselves, from trades in breach of applicable laws and company rules, and it has been questioned by some whether in some instances traders are not in fact "rogue", as in those cases in which employers directed the activity or knew of it and turned a blind eye to the transgressions due to the profits involved.

There have been colossal financial losses and bankruptcies from what are considered to be catastrophically bad decisions by senior decision-makers in financial institutions, such as the bankruptcy of Lehman Brothers which necessitated the 2008 United Kingdom bank rescue package, but this is not described as rogue trading and is not punishable.

== Largest rogue-trader losses ==
Name	Country	Date(s)	Loss	Institution	Market activity	Sentence	Incident
Jérôme Kerviel	Paris, France	2006–2008	$6.9 billion (€4.9 billion)	Société Générale	European Stock Index Futures	5 years prison of which 2 years were suspended	2008 Société Générale trading loss
Yasuo Hamanaka	Tokyo, Japan	1996	$2.6 billion	Sumitomo Corporation	Copper	8 years prison	Sumitomo copper affair
Kweku Adoboli	London, United Kingdom	2011	$2.3 billion	UBS	S&P 500, DAX, and EuroStoxx Futures	7 years prison	2011 UBS rogue trader scandal
Nick Leeson	United Kingdom	1995	$1.3 billion (£827 million)	Barings Bank	Nikkei Index Futures	6.5 years prison	
Toshihide Iguchi	Osaka, Japan / New York City, United States	1995	$1.1 billion	Resona Holdings	U.S. Treasury Bonds	4 years prison	
John Rusnak	Maryland, United States	2002	$691 million	Allied Irish Banks	Foreign Exchange Options	7.5 years prison	
Chen Jiulin	Singapore	2005	$550 million	China Aviation Oil	Jet Fuel Futures	4 years and 3 months prison	
David Bullen; Luke Duffy; Vince Ficarra; Gianni Gray	Melbourne, Australia	2003–2004	$187 million (A$360 million)	National Australia Bank	Foreign Exchange Options	3 years and 8 months prison 2 years and 5 months prison 2 years and 4 months prison 16 months prison	
Matthew Taylor	United States	2007	$118 million	Goldman Sachs	S&P 500 e-mini Futures	9 months prison	
Joseph Jett	United States	1994	$74.6 million	Kidder, Peabody & Co	US Treasury bonds.	banishing trading securities	
Stephen Perkins	London, United Kingdom	2009	$10 million	PVM Oil Futures	Brent Crude	barred from working as a trader & £72,000 fine	Oil futures drunk-trading incident

== See also ==
- List of trading losses
- Valuation control
