= Stock trader =

Person or company involved in trading equity securities

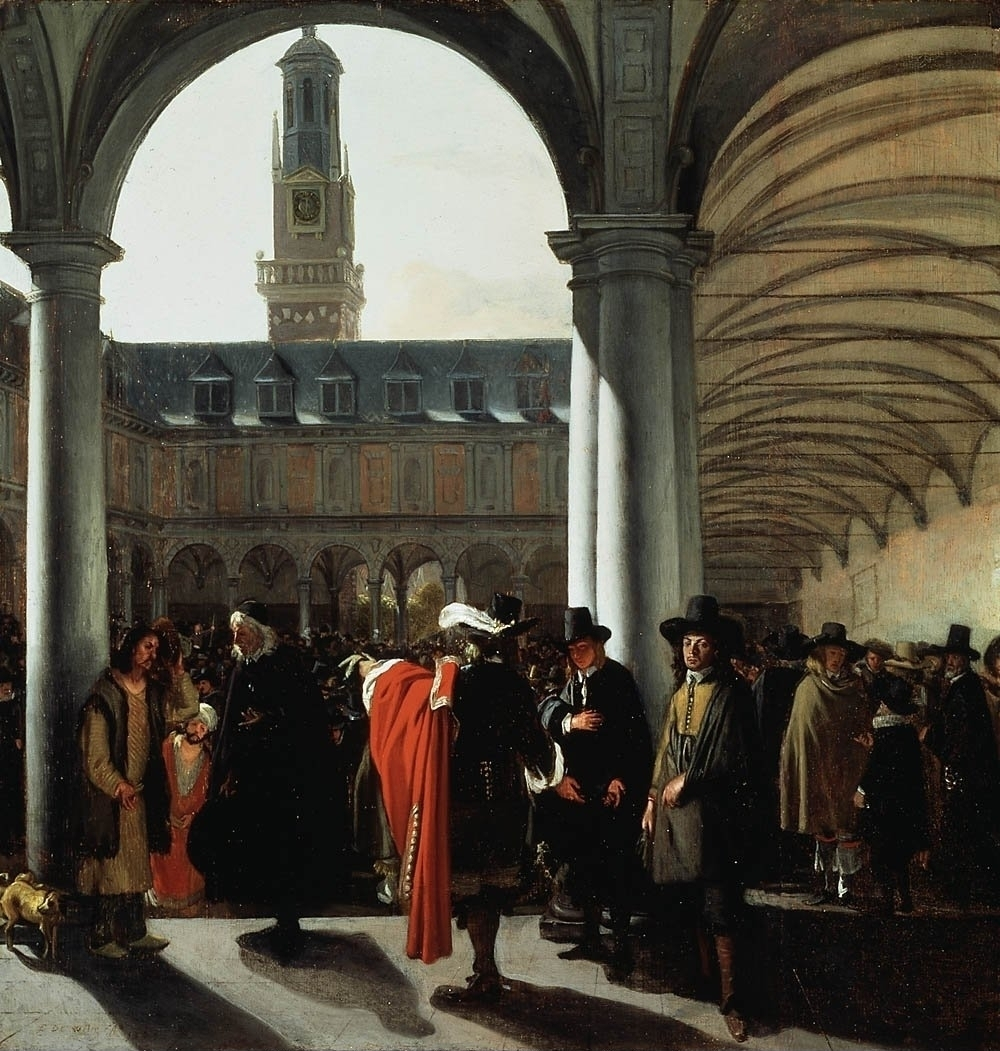
Courtyard of the Amsterdam Stock Exchange (Beurs van Hendrick de Keyser) by Emanuel de Witte, 1653

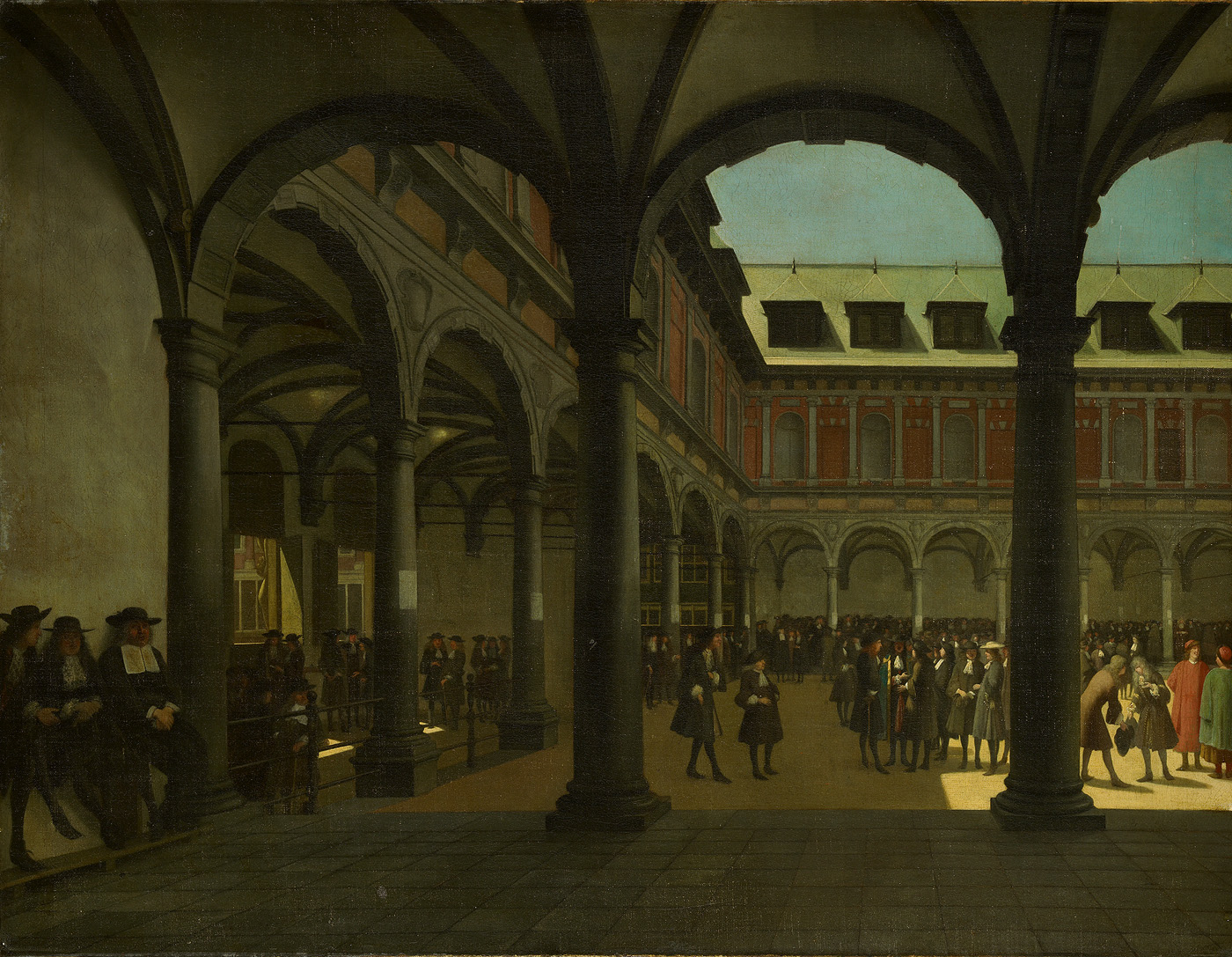
Courtyard of the Amsterdam Stock Exchange (Beurs van Hendrick de Keyser in Dutch)

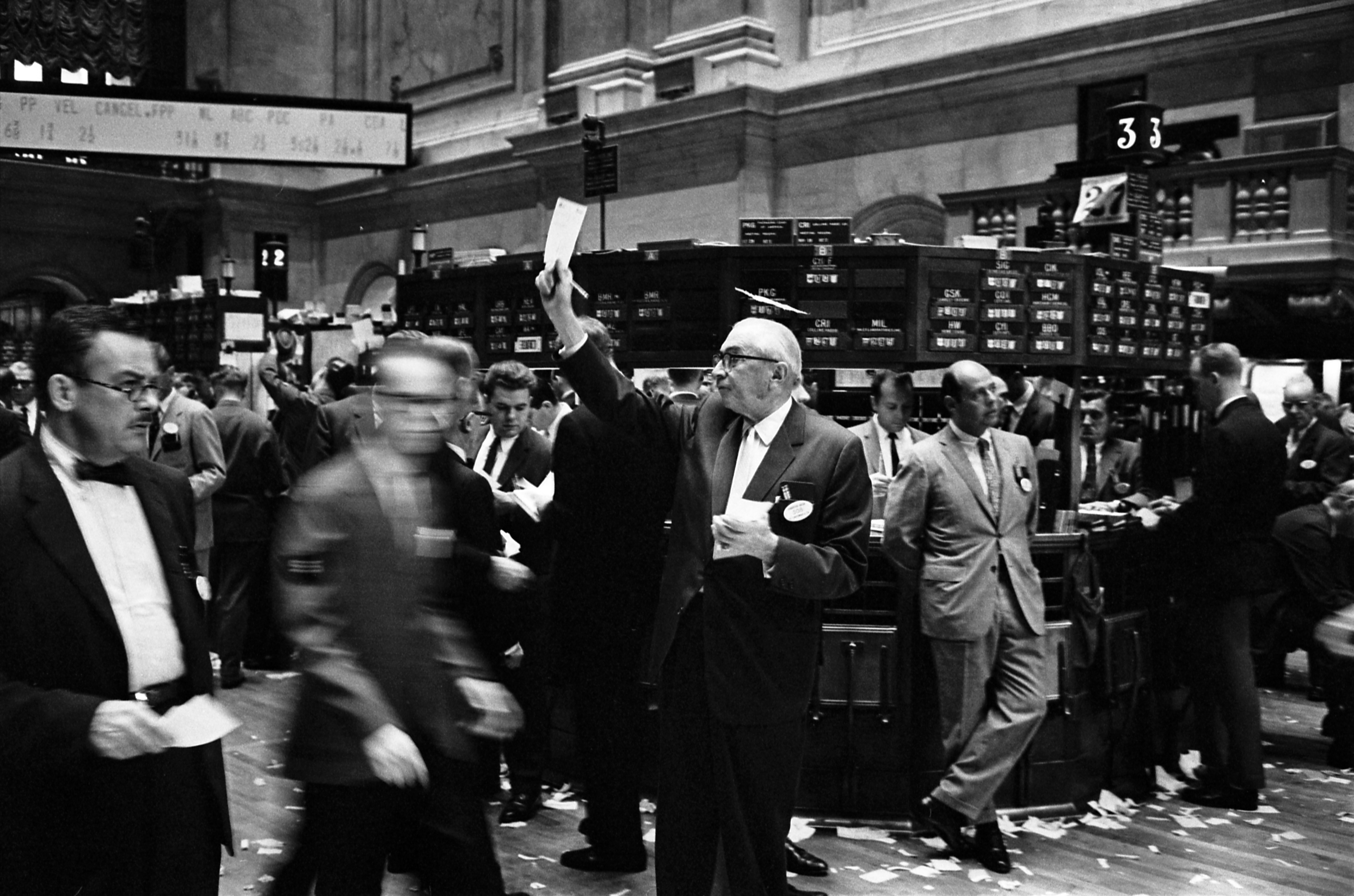
Historical photo of stock traders and stockbrokers in the trading floor of the New York Stock Exchange (1963)

A stock trader or equity trader or share trader, also called a stock investor, is a person or company involved in trading stocks and attempting to profit from the purchase and sale of those securities. Stock traders may be an investor, agent, hedger, arbitrageur, speculator, or stockbroker. Such equity trading in large publicly traded companies may be through a stock exchange. Stock shares in smaller public companies may be bought and sold in over-the-counter (OTC) markets or in some instances in equity crowdfunding platforms.

Stock traders can trade on their own account, called proprietary trading or self-directed trading, or through an agent authorized to buy and sell on the owner's behalf. That agent is referred to as a stockbroker. Agents are paid a commission for performing the trade. Proprietary or self-directed traders who use online brokerages (e.g., Fidelity, Interactive Brokers, Schwab, tastytrade) benefit from commission-free trades.

Major stock exchanges have market makers who help limit price variation (volatility) by buying and selling a particular company's shares on their own behalf and also on behalf of other clients.

== Stock trading as a profession/career ==
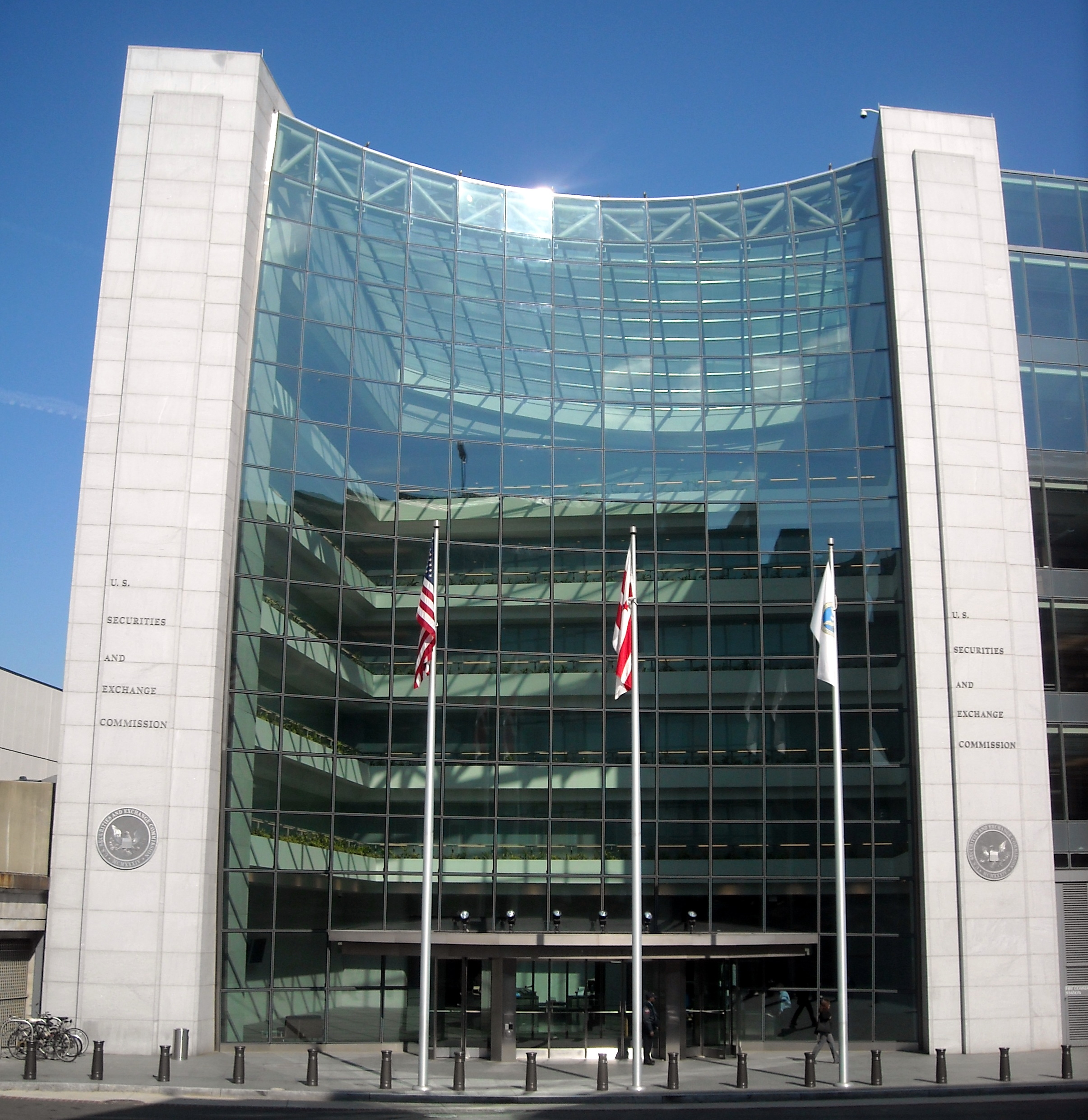
U.S. Securities and Exchange Commission headquarters in Washington, D.C.

Stock traders may advise shareholders and help manage portfolios. Traders engage in buying and selling bonds, stocks, futures and shares in hedge funds. A stock trader also conducts extensive research and observation of how financial markets perform. This is accomplished through economic and microeconomic study; consequently, more advanced stock traders will delve into macroeconomics and industry specific technical analysis to track asset or corporate performance. Other duties of a stock trader include comparison of financial analysis to current and future regulation of their occupation.

Professional stock traders who work for a financial company are required to complete an internship of up to four months before becoming established in their career field. In the United States, for example, internship is followed up by taking and passing a Financial Industry Regulatory Authority-administered Series 63 or 65 exam. Stock traders who pass demonstrate familiarity with U.S. Securities and Exchange Commission (SEC) compliant practices and regulation. Stock traders with experience usually obtain a four-year degree in a financial, accounting or economics field after licensure. Supervisory positions as a trader may usually require an MBA for advanced stock market analysis.

The U.S. Bureau of Labor Statistics (BLS) reported that growth for stock and commodities traders was forecast to be greater than 21% between 2006 and 2016. In that period, stock traders would benefit from trends driven by pensions of baby boomers and their decreased reliance on Social Security. U.S. Treasury bonds would also be traded on a more fluctuating basis. Stock traders just entering the field suffer since few entry-level positions exist. While entry into this career field is very competitive, increased ownership of stocks and mutual funds drive substantial career growth of traders. Banks were also offering more opportunities for people of average means to invest and speculate in stocks. The BLS reported that stock traders had median annual incomes of $68,500. Experienced traders of stocks and mutual funds have the potential to earn more than $145,600 annually.

=== Risks and other costs ===
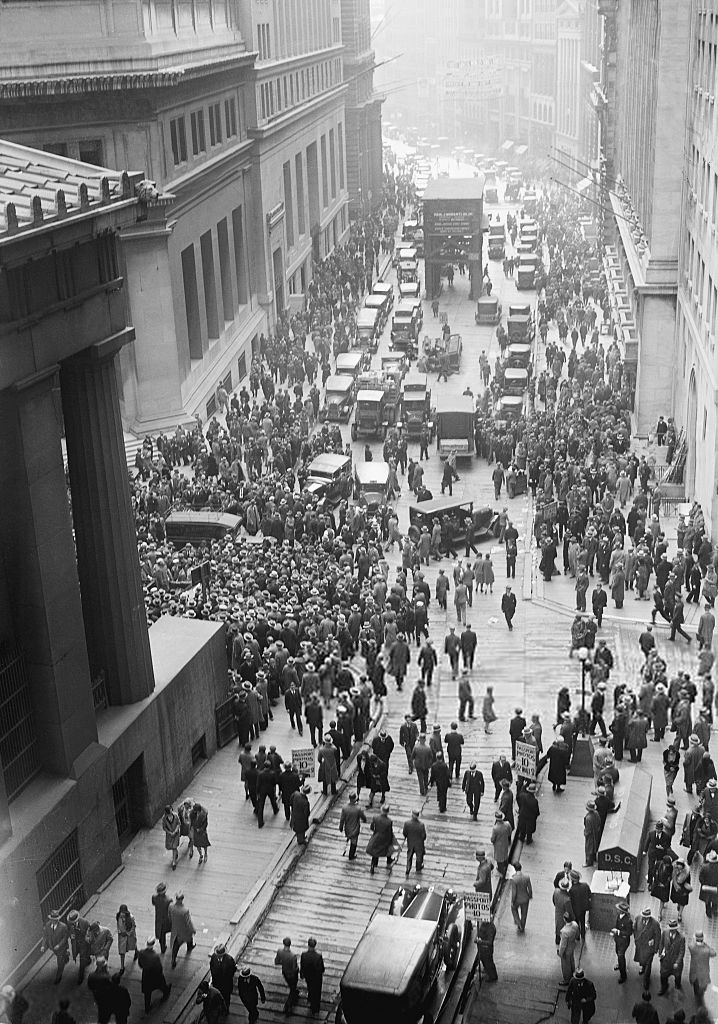
Crowd gathering on Wall Street after the Wall Street Crash of 1929

Contrary to a stockbroker, a professional who arranges transactions between a buyer and a seller, and gets a guaranteed commission for every deal executed, a professional trader may have a steep learning curve and his ultra-competitive performance based career may be cut short, especially during generalized stock market crashes. Stock market trading operations have a considerably high level of risk, uncertainty and complexity, especially for inexperienced stock traders and investors. In addition, trading activities are not free. Stock speculators/investors face several costs such as commissions, taxes and fees to be paid for the brokerage and other services, like the buying/selling orders placed through a stock broker stock exchange. Depending on the nature of each national or state legislation involved, a large array of fiscal obligations must be respected, and taxes are charged by jurisdictions over those transactions, dividends and capital gains that fall within their scope. However, these fiscal obligations will vary from jurisdiction to jurisdiction. Among other reasons, there could be some instances where taxation is already incorporated into the stock price through the differing legislation that companies have to comply with in their respective jurisdictions; or that tax free stock market operations are useful to boost economic growth. In the United States, for example, stock gains are generally taxed at two levels: For long-term capital gains (stocks sold after a minimum of one year's ownership, the tax rate currently (2024) is 20%. For short-term trades (stocks bought and sold within a 12-month period, capital gains are taxed at one's ordinary tax rate (e.g., 28%, 30%, 35%). Beyond these costs are the opportunity costs of money and time, currency risk, financial risk, and Internet, data and news agency services and electricity consumption expenses—all of which must be accounted for.

Stock market volatility can trigger mental health issues such as anxiety and depression. This fits in with research on the long term effects of the stock market on a person's mental health. Experienced stock traders and investors may develop psychological resilience to deal with these factors in the long run or otherwise risk continuous suffering from some type of mental health issue during the course of their careers or financial activities which are dependent on the stock market.

== Methodology ==
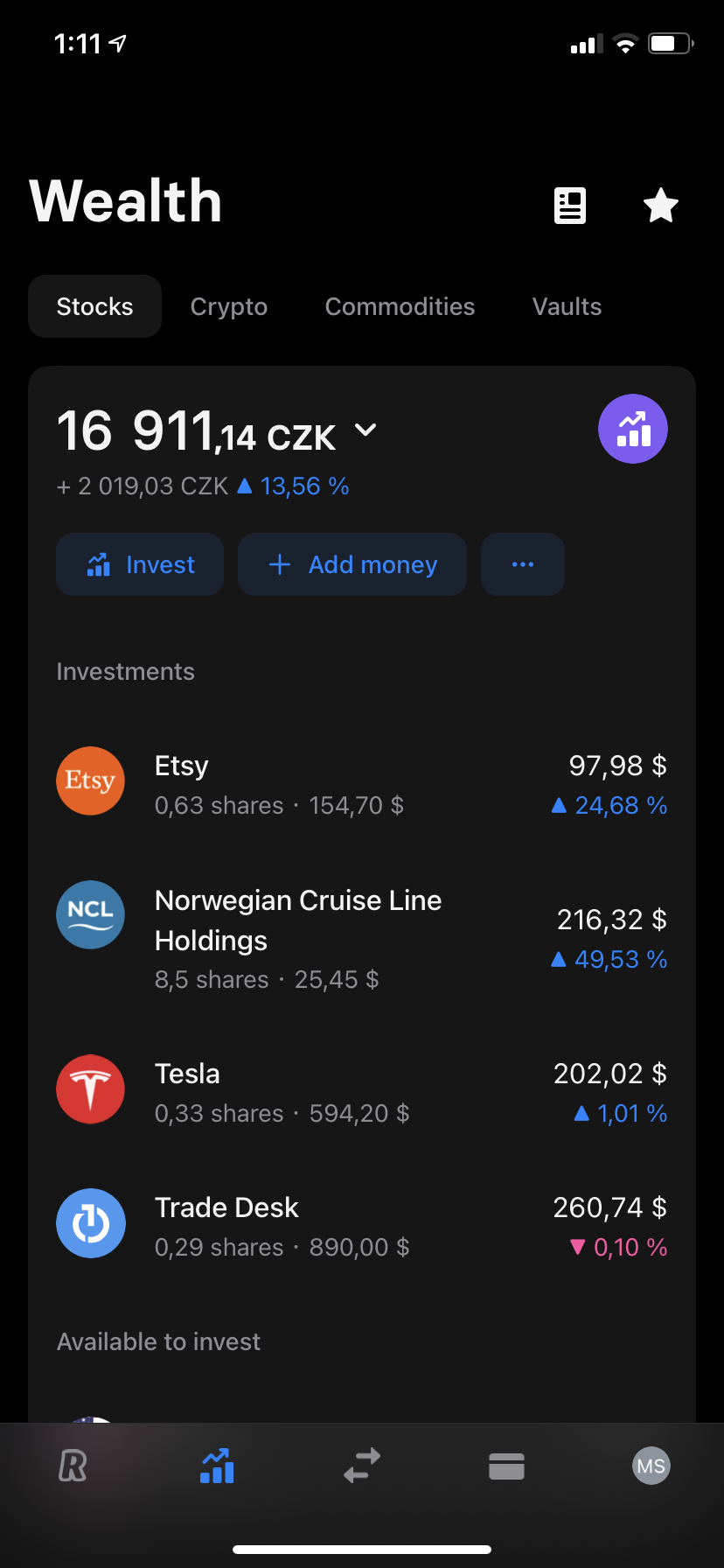
Both self-styled innovative fintech and traditional banking apps offer stock trading and investing tools to their customers.

Stock speculators and investors usually need a stock broker such as a bank or a brokerage firm to access the stock market. Since the advent of Internet banking, an Internet connection is commonly used to manage positions. Using the Internet, specialized software, a personal computer or a smartphone, stock speculators/investors make use of technical and fundamental analysis to help them in making decisions. They may use several information resources, some of which are strictly technical. Using the pivot points calculated from a previous day's trading, they attempt to predict the buy and sell points of the current day's trading session. These points give a cue to speculators, as to where prices will head for the day, prompting each speculator where to enter his trade, and where to exit. An added tool for the stock picker is the use of stock screens. Stock screens allow the user to input specific parameters, based on technical and/or fundamental conditions, that he or she deems desirable. Primary benefit associated with stock screens is its ability to return a small group of stocks for further analysis, among tens of thousands, that fit the requirements requested. There is criticism on the validity of using these technical indicators in analysis, and many professional stock speculators do not use them. Many full-time stock speculators and stock investors, as well as most other people in finance, traditionally have a formal education and training in fields such as economics, finance, mathematics and computer science, which may be particularly relevant to this occupation – since stock trading is not an exact science, stock prices have in general a random or chaotic behaviour and there is no proven technique for trading stocks profitably, the degree of knowledge in those fields is ultimately neglectable.

One popular example is to base trading decisions on the trend direction of a stock's price action. There are basically three directions a stock can trend in: up, down, and level or flat. These trends are determined by using certain technical indicators such as candlesticks, moving averages, bollinger bands, standard deviation tunnels. These indicators (and others) should be used in different time frames.

== Stock picking ==
=== The efficient-market hypothesis ===
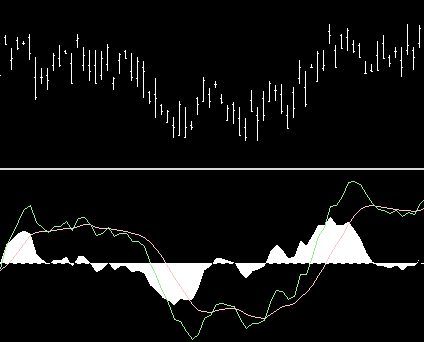
Technical analysis is the use of graphical and analytical patterns and data to attempt to predict future prices.

Although many companies offer courses in stock picking, and numerous experts report success through technical analysis and fundamental analysis, many economists and academics state that because of the efficient-market hypothesis (EMH) it is unlikely that any amount of analysis can help an investor make any gains above the stock market itself. In the distribution of investors, many academics believe that the richest are simply outliers in such a distribution (i.e. in a game of chance, they have flipped heads twenty times in a row). When money is put into the stock market, it is done with the aim of generating a return on the capital invested. Many investors try not only to make a profitable return, but also to outperform, or beat, the market. However, market efficiency, championed in the EMH formulated by Eugene Fama in 1970, suggests that at any given time, prices fully reflect all available information on a particular stock and/or market.

Thus, according to the EMH, no investor has an advantage in predicting a return on a stock price because no one has access to information not already available to everyone else. In efficient markets, prices become not predictable but random, so no investment pattern can be discerned. A planned approach to investment, therefore, cannot be successful. This "random walk" of prices, commonly spoken about in the EMH school of thought, results in the failure of any investment strategy that aims to beat the market consistently. In fact, the EMH suggests that given the transaction costs involved in portfolio management, it would be more profitable for an investor to put their money into an index fund.

=== Mandelbrot's fractal theory ===
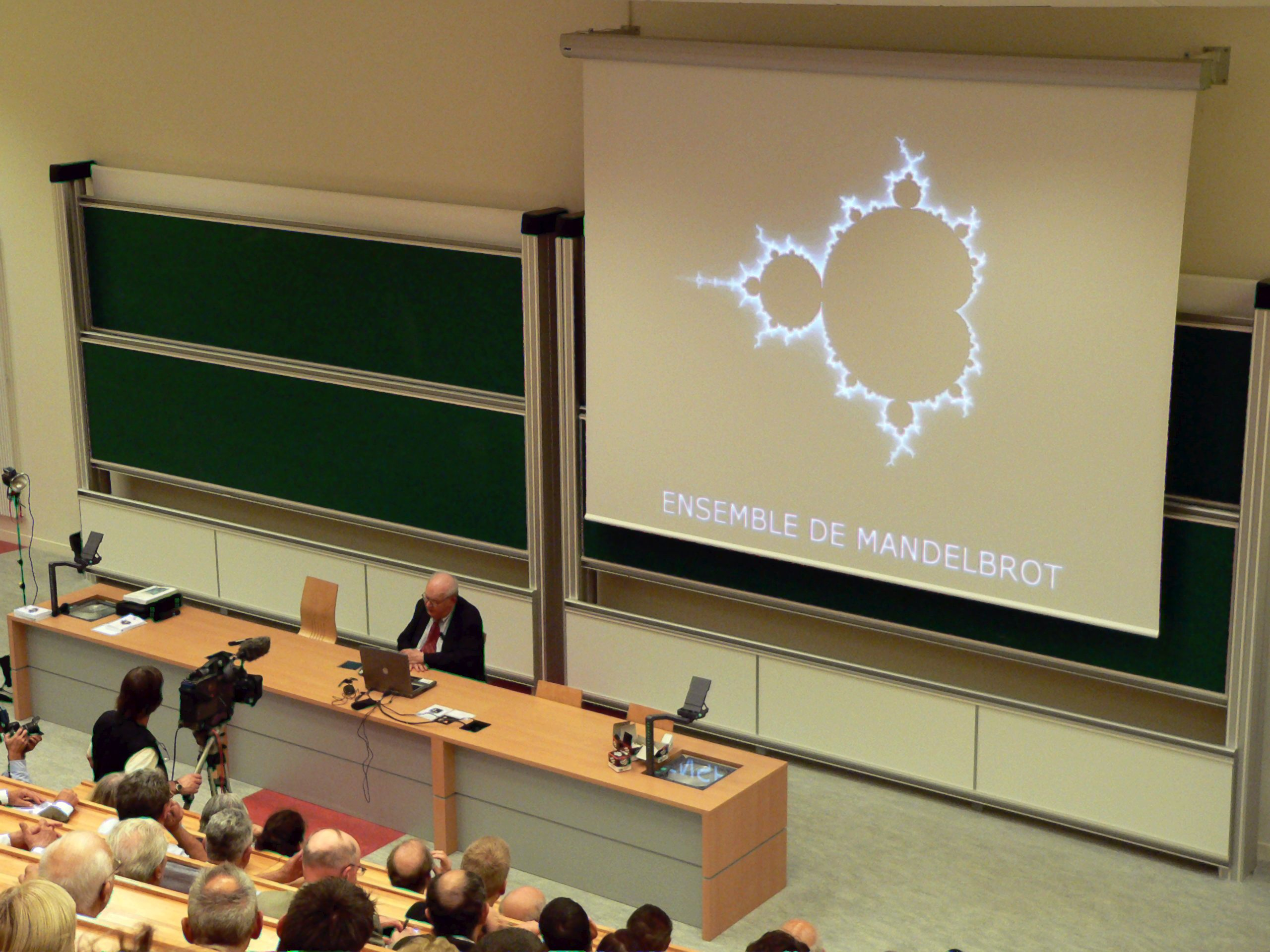
Benoît Mandelbrot during his speech at the ceremony when he was made an officer of the Legion of Honour on September 11, 2006, at the École Polytechnique; here, with a display of the Mandelbrot set.

In 1963 Benoit Mandelbrot analyzed the variations of cotton prices on a time series starting in 1900. There were two important findings. First, price movements had very little to do with a normal distribution in which the bulk of the observations lies close to the mean (68% of the data are within one standard deviation). Instead, the data showed a great frequency of extreme variations. Second, price variations followed patterns that were indifferent to scale: the curve described by price changes for a single day was similar to a month's curve. Surprisingly, these patterns of self-similarity were present during the entire period from 1900 to 1960, a violent epoch that had seen a Great Depression and two world wars. Mandelbrot used his fractal theory to explain the presence of extreme events in Wall Street. In 2004 he published his book on the "misbehavior" of financial markets The (Mis)behavior of Markets: A Fractal View of Risk, Ruin, and Reward. The basic idea that relates fractals to financial markets is that the probability of experiencing extreme fluctuations (like the ones triggered by herd behavior) is greater than what conventional wisdom wants us to believe. This of course delivers a more accurate vision of risk in the world of finance. The central objective in financial markets is to maximize income for a given level of risk. Standard models for this are based on the premise that the probability of extreme variations of asset prices is very low.

These models rely on the assumption that asset price fluctuations are the result of a well-behaved random or stochastic process. This is why mainstream models (such as the famous Black–Scholes model) use normal probabilistic distributions to describe price movements. For all practical purposes, extreme variations can be ignored. Mandelbrot thought this was an awful way to look at financial markets. For him, the distribution of price movements is not normal and has the property of kurtosis, where fat tails abound. This is a more faithful representation of financial markets: the movements of the Dow index for the past hundred years reveals a troubling frequency of violent movements. Still, conventional models used by the time of the 2008 financial crisis ruled out these extreme variations and considered they can only happen every 10,000 years. An obvious conclusion from Mandelbrot's work is that greater regulation in financial markets is indispensable. Other contributions of his work for the study of stock market behaviour are the creation of new approaches to evaluate risk and avoid unanticipated financial collapses.

=== Tenets of Fractal Finance ===
Mandelbrot delves into several key principles of fractal finance in The Misbehavior of Markets: A Fractal View of Financial Turbulence:

1. "Inherent Market Turbulence: Markets are described as chaotic with price fluctuations at different time scales, contrary to the conventional view of market stability.
2. Increased Market Risk: The authors show that markets are riskier than standard theories suggest, with frequent extreme events ("black swans").
3. Market Memory: Contradicting the efficient market hypothesis, the authors claim that markets have memory, affecting future price movements.
4. Self-Similarity Across Time Scales: Financial markets exhibit similar patterns at different levels.
5. Nonlinearity of Markets: Small changes can lead to large, unpredictable outcomes.
6. Human Behavior in Markets: Human emotions and behaviors significantly influence market dynamics."

=== Beating the market, fraud and scams ===
Outside of academia, the controversy surrounding market timing is primarily focused on day trading conducted by individual investors and the mutual fund trading scandals perpetrated by institutional investors in 2003. Media coverage of these issues has been so prevalent that many investors now dismiss market timing as a credible investment strategy. Unexposed insider trading, accounting fraud, embezzlement and pump and dump strategies are factors that hamper an efficient, rational, fair and transparent investing, because they may create fictitious company's financial statements and data, leading to inconsistent stock prices.

Throughout the stock markets history, there have been dozens of scandals involving listed companies, stock investing methods and brokerage.

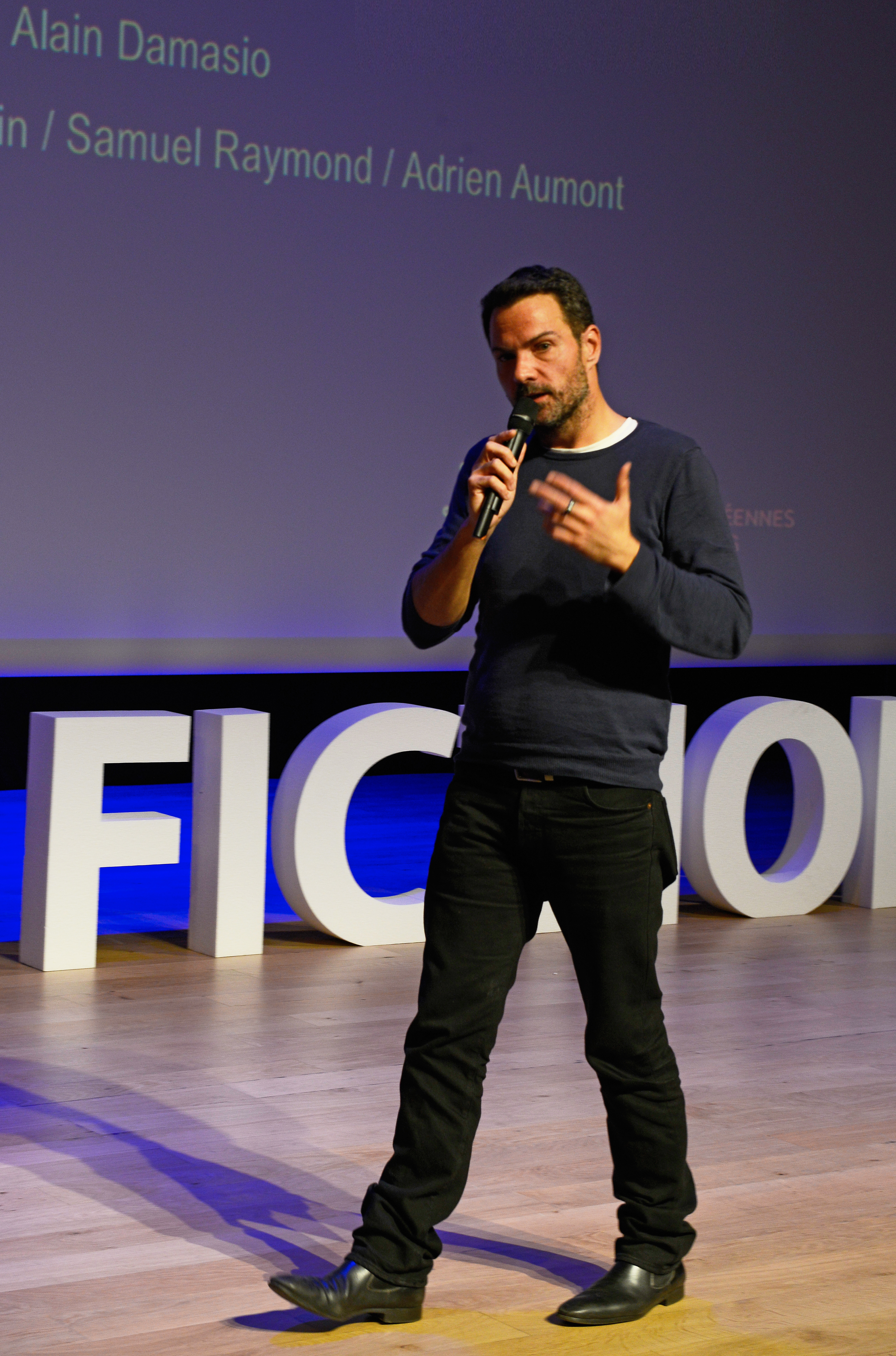
Jérôme Kerviel in 2015

Jérôme Kerviel (Société Générale) and Kweku Adoboli (UBS), two rogue traders, worked in the same type of position, the delta one desk: a table where derivatives are traded, and not single stocks or bonds. These types of operations are relatively simple and often reserved for novice traders who also specialize in exchange-traded funds (ETFs), financial products that mimic the performance of an index (i.e. either upward or downward). As they are easy to use, they facilitate portfolio diversification through the acquisition of contracts backed by a stock index or industry (e.g. commodities). The two traders were very familiar to control procedures. They worked in the back office, the administrative body of the bank that controls the regularity of operations, before moving to trading. According to the report of the Inspector General of Societe Generale, in 2005 and 2006 Kerviel "led" by taking 100 to 150 million-euro positions on the shares of SolarWorld listed in Germany. Moreover, the "unauthorized trading" of Kweku Adoboli, similar to Kerviel, did not date back a long way. Adoboli had executed operations since October 2008; his failure and subsequent arrest occurred in 2011.

A classical case related to insider trading of listed companies involved Raj Rajaratnam and its hedge fund management firm, the Galleon Group. On Friday October 16, 2009, he was arrested by the FBI and accused of conspiring with others in insider trading in several publicly traded companies. U.S. Attorney Preet Bharara put the total profits in the scheme at over $60 million, telling a news conference it was the largest hedge fund insider trading case in United States history. A well publicized accounting fraud of a listed company involved Satyam. On January 7, 2009, its chairman Raju resigned after publicly announcing his involvement in a massive accounting fraud. Ramalinga Raju was sent to the Hyderabad prison along with his brother and former board member Rama Raju, and the former CFO Vadlamani Srinivas. In Italy, Parmalat's Calisto Tanzi was charged with financial fraud and money laundering in 2008. Italians were shocked that such a vast and established empire could crumble so quickly. When the scandal was made known, the share price of Parmalat in the Milan Stock Exchange tumbled. Parmalat had sold itself credit-linked notes, in effect placing a bet on its own credit worthiness in order to conjure up an asset out of thin air. After his arrest, Tanzi reportedly admitted during questioning at Milan's San Vittore prison, that he diverted funds from Parmalat into Parmatour and elsewhere. The family football and tourism enterprises were financial disasters; as well as Tanzi's attempt to rival Berlusconi by buying Odeon TV, only to sell it at a loss of about €45 million. Tanzi was sentenced to 10 years in prison for fraud relating to the collapse of the dairy group. The other seven defendants, including executives and bankers, were acquitted. Another eight defendants settled out of court in September 2008.

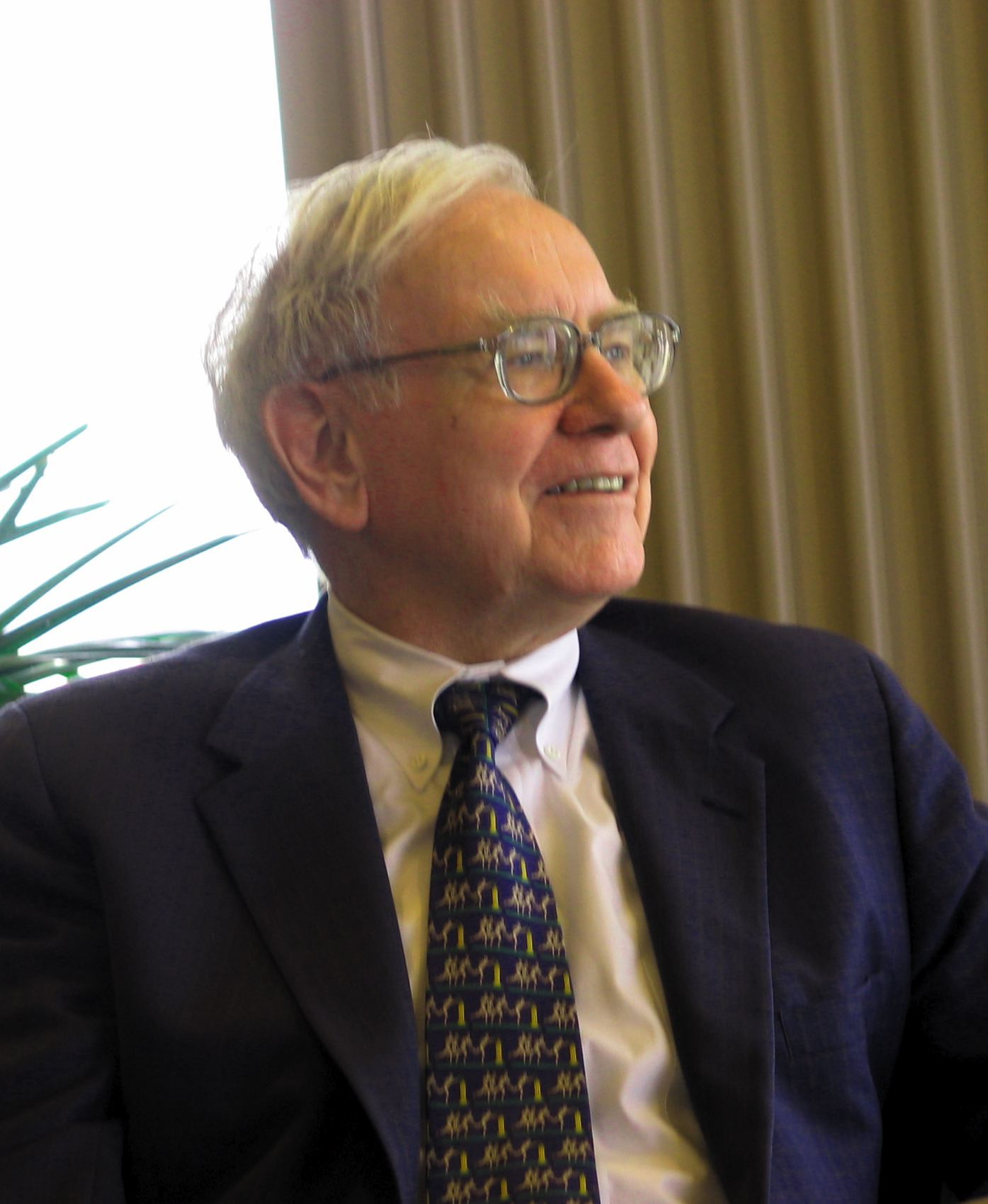
Warren Buffett became known as one of the most successful and influential stock investors in history. His approach to investing is almost impossible for individual investors to duplicate because he uses leverage and a long-term approach that most people lack the will to follow.

Day trading sits at the extreme end of the investing spectrum from conventional buy-and-hold wisdom. It is the ultimate market-timing strategy. While all the attention that day trading attracts seems to suggest that the theory is sound, critics argue that, if that were so, at least one famous money manager would have mastered the system and claimed the title of "the Warren Buffett of day trading". The long list of successful investors that have become legends in their own time, where George Soros rivals Warren Buffett for the title of most successful stock investor of all time, does not include a single individual that built his or her reputation by day trading.

Even Michael Steinhardt, who made his fortune trading in time horizons ranging from 30 minutes to 30 days, claimed to take a long-term perspective on his investment decisions. From an economic perspective, many professional money managers and financial advisors shy away from day trading, arguing that the reward simply does not justify the risk. Attempting to make a profit is the reason investors invest, and buy low and sell high is the general goal of most investors (although short-selling and arbitrage take a different approach, the success or failure of these strategies still depends on timing).

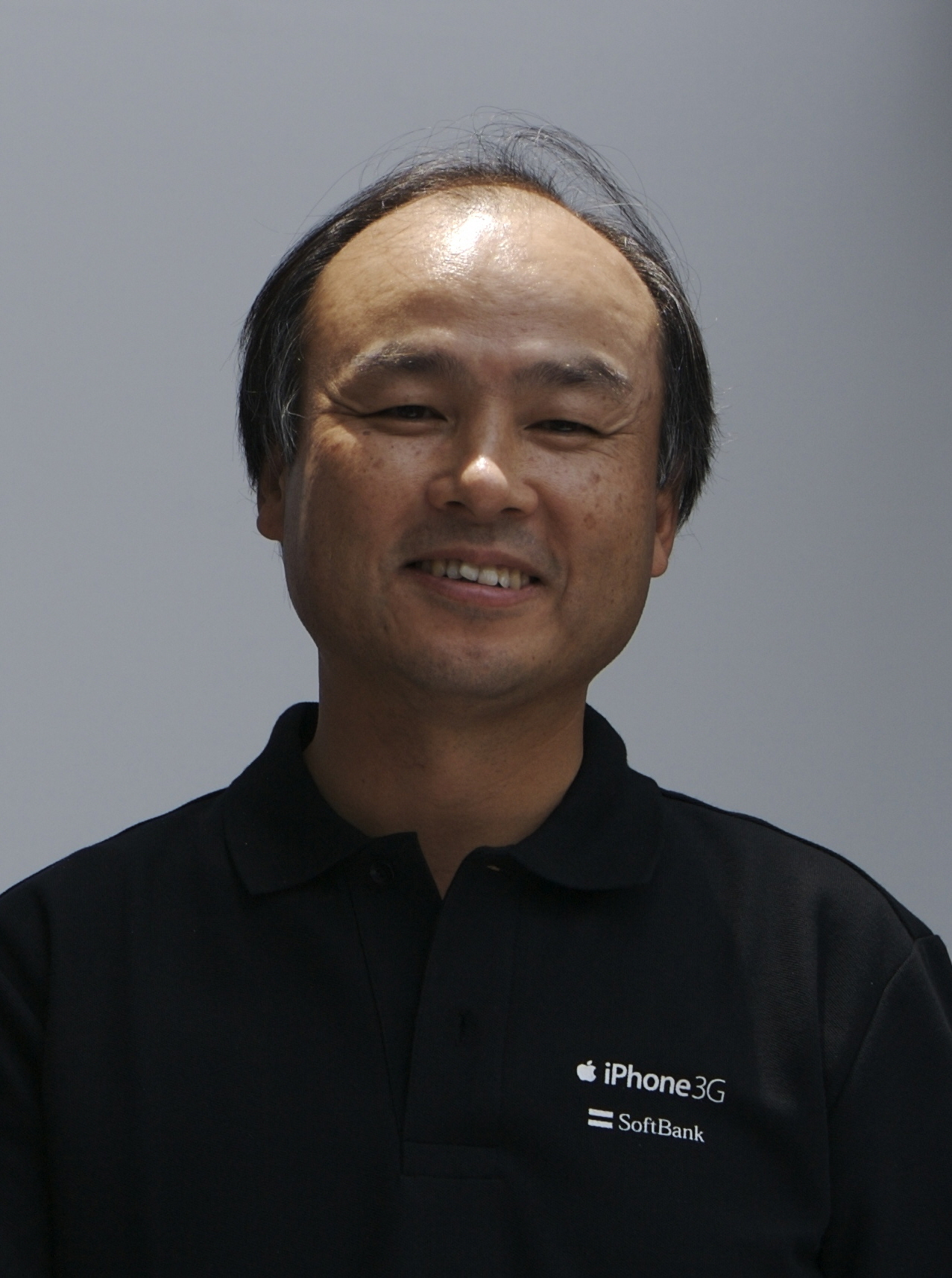
Masayoshi Son achieved fame as a stock investor after a successful and very profitable early-stage investment in Alibaba Group and the subsequent morphing of his own telecom company Softbank Corp into an investment management firm called Softbank Group. However, a series of failed high-profile investments prompted criticism on him.

The problems with mutual fund trading that cast market timing in a negative light occurred because the prospectuses written by the mutual fund companies strictly forbid short-term trading. Despite this prohibition, special clients were allowed to do it anyway. So, the problem was not with the trading strategy but rather with the unethical and unfair implementation of that strategy, which permitted some investors to engage in it while excluding others. All of the world's greatest investors rely, to some extent, on market timing for their success. Whether they base their buy-sell decisions on fundamental analysis of the markets, technical analysis of individual companies, personal intuition, or all of the above, the ultimate reason for their success involves making the right trades at the right time. In most cases, those decisions involve extended periods of time and are based on buy-and-hold investment strategies. Value investing is a clear example, as the strategy is based on buying stocks that trade for less than their intrinsic values and selling them when their value is recognized in the marketplace. Most value investors are known for their patience, as undervalued stocks often remain undervalued for significant periods of time.

Some investors choose a blend of technical, fundamental and environmental factors to influence where and when they invest. These strategists reject the 'chance' theory of investing, and attribute their higher level of returns to both insight and discipline.

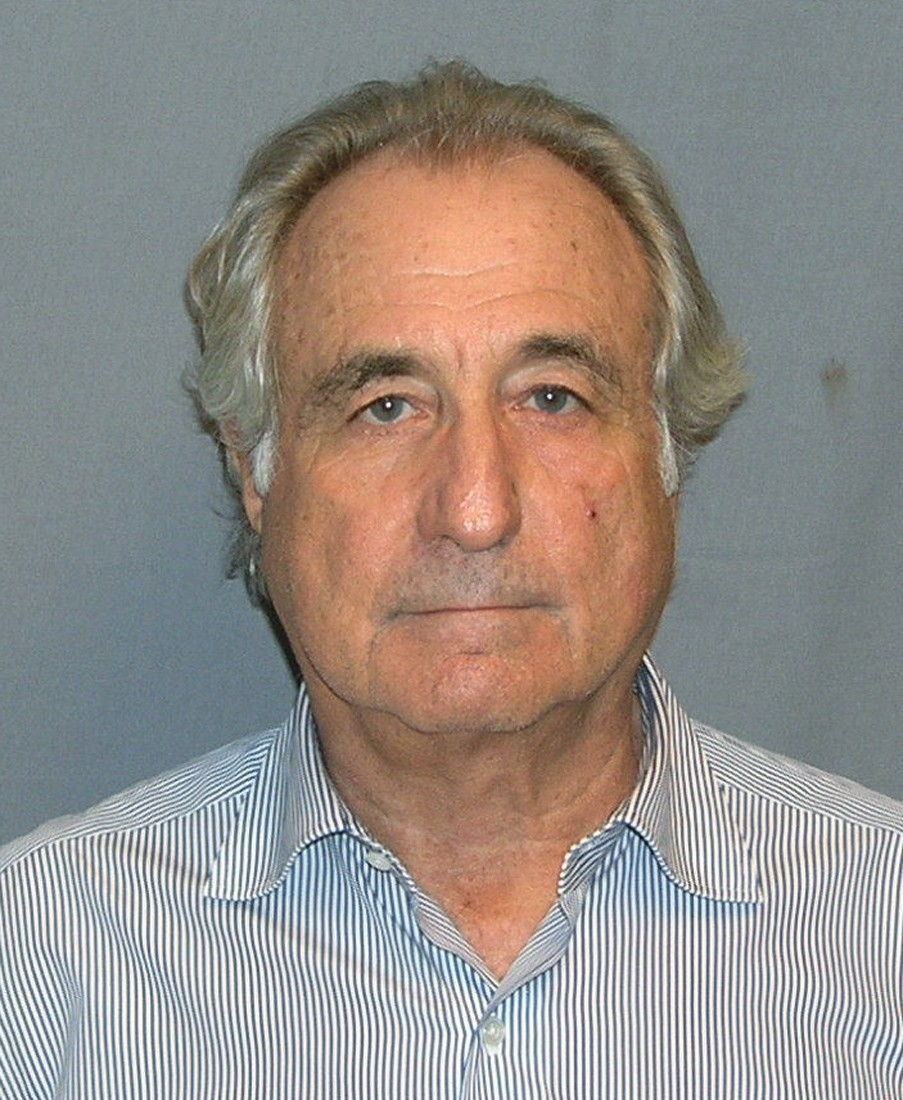
Bernard Madoff claimed to make money for him and others by trading stocks; in fact, it was all fictitious (see Ponzi scheme).

Financial fail and unsuccessful stories related with stock trading abound. Every year, a lot of money is wasted in non-peer-reviewed (and largely unregulated) publications and courses attended by individuals that get persuaded and take the bill, hoping getting rich by trading on the markets. This opens the door to widespread promotion of inaccurate and unproven trading methods for stocks, bonds, commodities, or Forex, while generating sizable revenues for unscrupulous authors, advisers and self-titled trading gurus. Most active money managers produce worse returns than an index, such as the S&P 500.

Speculation in stocks is a risky and complex undertaking because the direction of the markets are considered generally unpredictable and lack transparency, also financial regulators are sometimes unable to adequately detect, prevent and remediate irregularities committed by malicious listed companies or other financial market participants. In addition, the financial markets are subject to speculation. This does not invalidate the well documented true and genuine stories of large successes and consistent profitability of many individual stock investors and stock investing organizations in history.

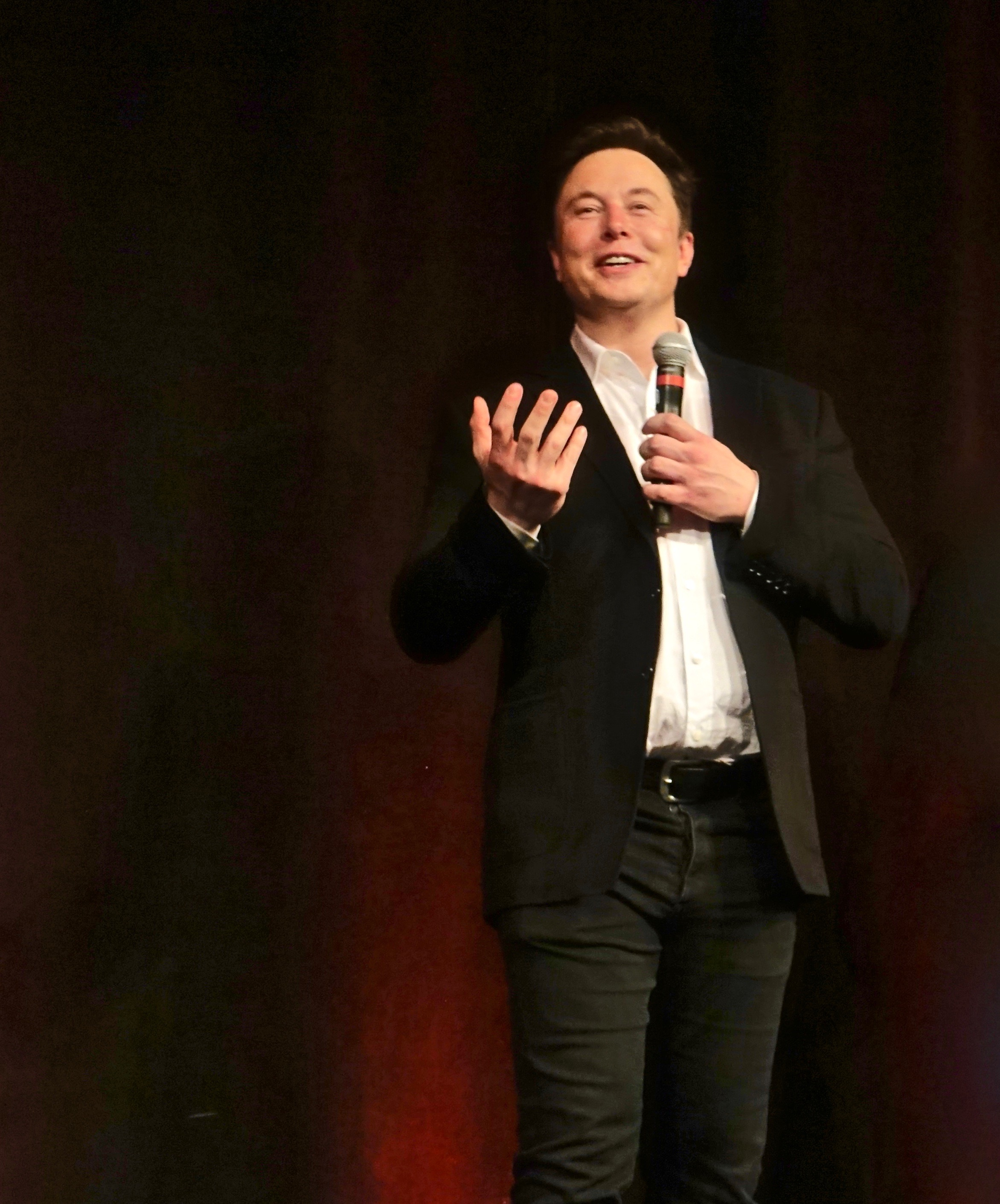
Elon Musk, world-famous entrepreneur and investor, at the 2019 Tesla Annual Shareholder Meeting

Masayoshi Son was for many years the stock investor-shareholder who had lost the most money in history (more than $59bn during the dot com crash of 2000 alone, when his SoftBank shares plummeted), but he was surpassed by other billionaire investors and shareholders like Elon Musk (whose net worth peaked in November 2021 at $340 billion and then plunged to $137 billion after Tesla shares have plummeted 65% in 2022; a Guinness World Record) in the following years. These significant changes on the net worth of big stock owners are expectable in the long term and are the end result of the volatile nature of the stock market, the shortcomings of financial risk and unavoidable changes in asset valuation. Smaller stockholders may experience proportionally equal changes in their stock market-based assets.

In order to successfully address all the shortcomings, doubts, fallacies, noise and bureaucratic bottlenecks associated with stock investing, like unchecked speculation and fraud as well as imperfect information, excessive risk and costs, stock investor John Clifton "Jack" Bogle (1929 – 2019) became world-renowned for founding the American investment fund manager Vanguard Group in 1975, and for designing the first index replication fund. Bogle studied economics at Princeton University, specializing in mutual funds, and early on demonstrated a strong inclination toward the principles of passive stock management on which he later built the Vanguard Group. Bogle felt that it would be virtually impossible for an investor to consistently beat the stock market, and that the potential gains made are usually diluted by the heavy cost structure associated with security selection - number of transactions - resulting in a below-average return. Based on this principle, he designed the first index fund, allowing his investors to access the entire market in a simple, comprehensive way and at extremely competitive costs.

== Psychology ==
Trading psychology is the study of human mindset and how it functions in terms of identity, beliefs and behaviors while actively trading regulated and non-regulated assets. This area of psychology can reveal core human inclinations because certain emotions like greed, fear and regret play important roles in the trading process.

One study analyzing trades from 2000 to 2016 found elite traders were better than random chance at buying stocks, but worse than random chance when selling, perhaps because they did not track post-sale performance, and spent more time thinking about buying than selling.

== See also ==
- Brokerage firm
- Day trader
- Dead cat bounce
- Derivatives market
- Don't fight the tape
- Fundamental analysis
- Option (finance)
- Paper trading
- Shareholder
- Slippage (finance)
- Stock
- Stockbroker
- Stock exchange
- Stock market
- Stock market data systems
- Technical analysis
- Technical analysis software
- Trader (finance)
- Value investing
