= Marcel Rohner =

Marcel Rohner may refer to:

- Marcel Rohner (banker) (born 1964), Swiss businessman, former Chairman and CEO of UBS AG
- Marcel Rohner (bobsledder) (born 1964), Swiss bobsledder
