= Mr. Five Percent =

Mr. Five Percent can refer to:

- Calouste Gulbenkian (1869–1955), British-Armenian businessman and philanthropist
- Yasuo Hamanaka (born 1950), Japanese businessman

== See also ==
- Mr. Ten Percent, Asif Ali Zardari
