= Lucerne Capital Management =

Long-short equity investment firm

Lucerne Capital Management, LP
- Industry: Equity investment
- Founded: 2002; 24 years ago
- Founder: Pieter Taselaar
- Headquarters: Greenwich, Connecticut, U.S.
- Key people: Thijs Hovers (Partner)
- Products: Hedge fund
- AUM: $1.107 billion (March 2019)
- Website: www.lucernecap.com

Lucerne Capital Management is a long-short equity investment firm, founded in 2000 by Pieter Taselaar, that specializes in bottom up stock selection with a focus on European markets.

== Overview ==
Pieter Taselaar founded Lucerne Capital Management after leaving investment bank ABN in 2002. Lucerne is headquartered in Greenwich, Connecticut and the company has a research office in Amsterdam, Netherlands. The firm has 12 employees (excluding clerical workers) and in March 2019 reported $1,107,764,000 in assets under management. Lucerne Capital invests in companies with strong free cash flow.

Lucerne Capital ranked 25th in Barron's 2016 list of "Best 100 Hedge Funds".

== Investments ==
In the 4th quarter of 2017, Lucerne Capital purchased a new stake in Altice USA, valued at about $129,721,000, bringing its total shares to 7,455,917.
