= Oswald Grübel =

German banker (born 1943)

Oswald J. Grübel
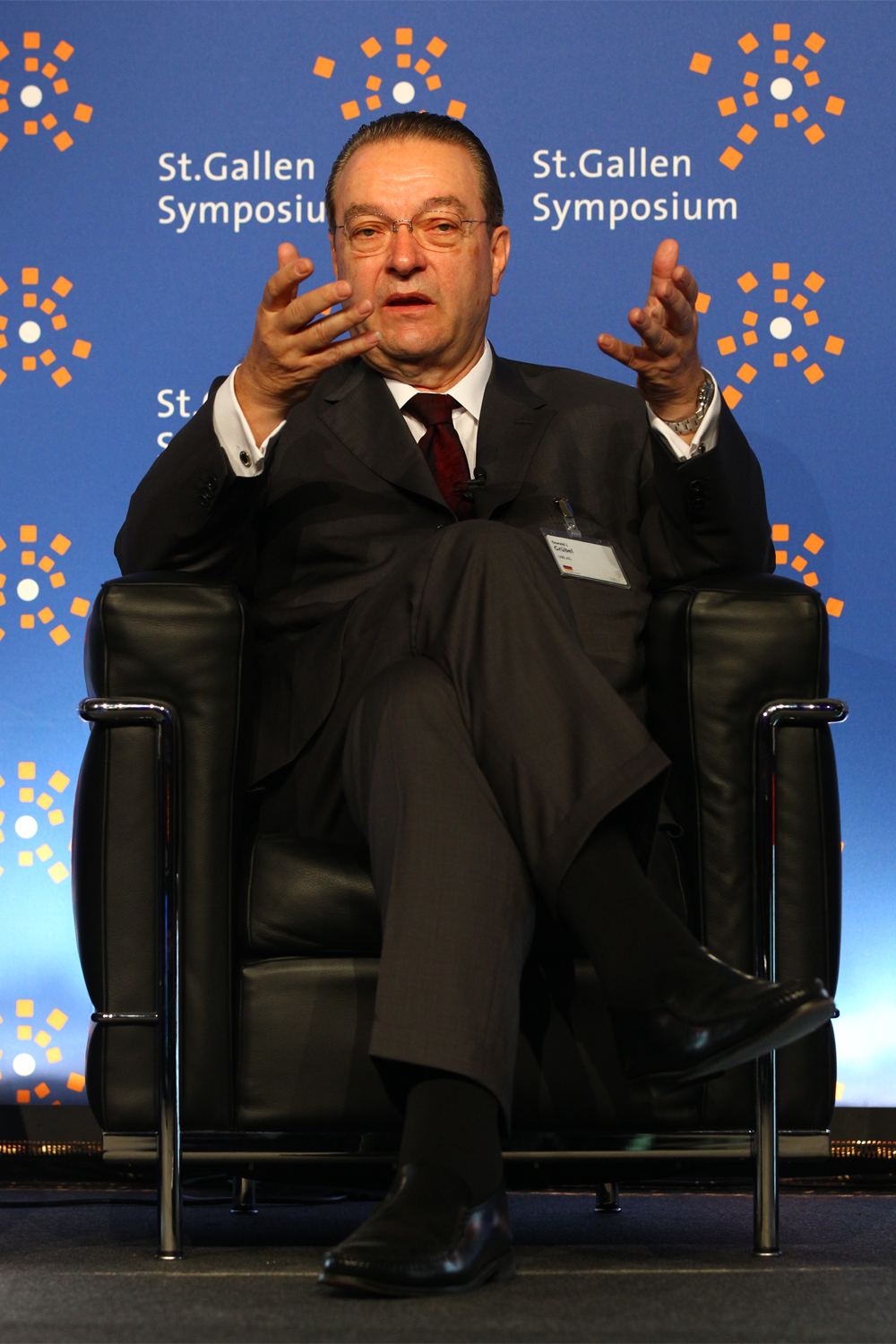
- Grübel in 2011
- Born: 23 November 1943 (age 81); Ilmenau, Germany
- Occupation: Former CEO of UBS AG
- Children: 1

Oswald Jürgen Grübel (born November 23, 1943) is a German banker who was the group chief executive officer of Swiss bank UBS AG from 26 February 2009 until his sudden resignation on the 24 September 2011 in the wake of the 2011 UBS rogue trader scandal. Previously, he has been head of Credit Suisse between 2003 and 2007.

== Education ==
Grübel did not attend university, but took an apprenticeship in banking and securities trading at Deutsche Bank in Mannheim and Frankfurt.

== Career ==
Grübel began his career at a White Weld & Co. joint venture with Credit Suisse in the 1970s. Before joining UBS, Grübel was at Credit Suisse from 1985 until 2007, leading the firm since 2003.

He was CEO of Credit Suisse Financial Services from 2002 to 2004 and was co-CEO of Credit Suisse Group (with John J. Mack) from 2003 until 2004. Grübel was a member of the Credit Suisse Group Executive Board between 1997 and 2001 and again from 2002 to 2007. He became the sole CEO with the ousting of John Mack in 2004.

After he retired in May 2007, he still held a board position at the Winterthur Group insurance company (a part of AXA) from 2007 until 2009.

As chairman of the CEO position at UBS he made a promise that he will lead the bank back to the profit zone of 15 billion USDS in 2014.

=== Resignation from UBS group ===
On 24 September 2011, the UBS board announced that Oswald Gruebel had resigned. Earlier he had been under pressure having assumed the full responsibility for the USD 2.3 billion loss resulting from the 2011 UBS rogue trader scandal. Several local newspaper brought up that he might have left due to the pressure of the main stakeholders.

Business positions
Preceded by John J. Mack	CEO of Credit Suisse; 2003–2007	Succeeded by Brady Dougan
Preceded by Marcel Rohner	Group CEO of UBS AG; 2009-2011	Succeeded by Sergio Ermotti
