= Peter Wuffli =

Swiss businessman (born 1957)

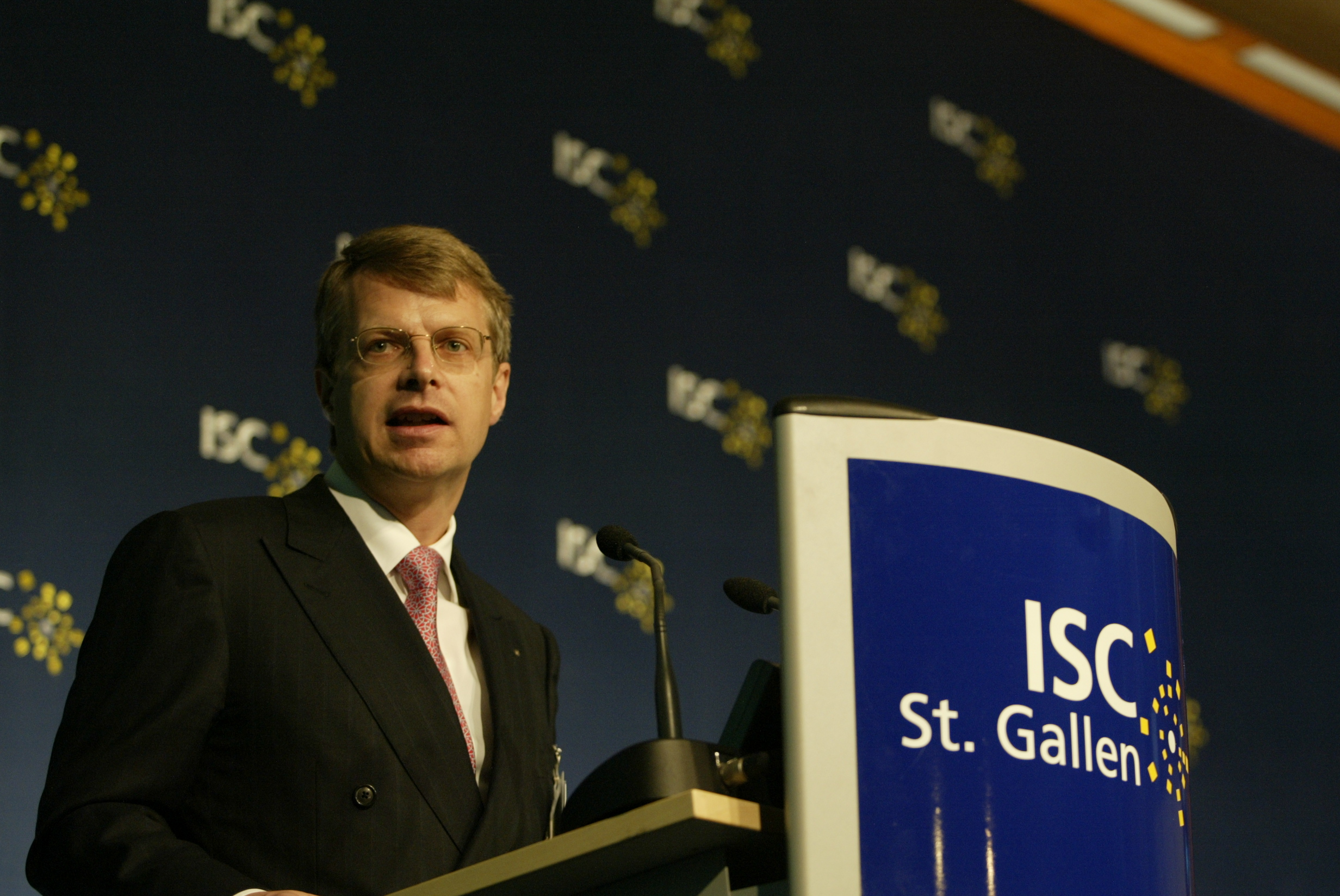
- Wuffli in 2005
- Born: October 26, 1957 (age 68); Zürich, Switzerland
- Education: University of St. Gallen
- Occupation: Banker

Peter A. Wuffli (born 26 October 1957) is a Swiss businessman who was appointed president and chief executive officer of UBS in December 2001 after having been chief executive of UBS Asset Management and the company's chief financial officer.

== Education and personal life ==
He is a Swiss citizen and graduated from the University of St. Gallen in 1981 and earned a doctorate in 1984. He also attended the Advanced Management Program at Wharton School of the University of Pennsylvania. He and his wife Susanna have three children.

His father Heinz R. Wuffli was general director of Credit Suisse from 1967 to 1977, when he resigned as a consequence of the Chiasso affair.

== Career ==
In 1984, he joined McKinsey & Co as management consultant and in 1990 became a partner of McKinsey Switzerland's senior management.

From 1994 to 1998, he was the chief financial officer at SBC and a member of SBC's group executive board in Basel. After the 1998 merger of SBC and UBS, Wufflii was appointed president of the Group Executive Board in 2001 and became CEO in 2003.

In May 2006 Wuffli heralded UBS’s acquisition of Brazilian Banco Pactual as an opening for UBS into one of the world’s fastest growing financial markets and an excellent basis for growth in Brazil and throughout Latin America.

Wuffli left as a CEO UBS on 6 July 2007 and renounced about $10 million in payments.

On July 7, 2007 UBS declined to comment on Wuffli’s leaving, only confirming that his departure, a decision which was taken in a regular board meeting in Valencia, Spain, was based on the review of the position. Analysts and investors suspected the drop in profits, hedge fund losses and the underperformance of its shares to be the reason, and as a possible indication of the bank’s shifting core business to wealth and investment management.

In February 2009 it became known that multi-billion dollar write-downs had sparked the sudden 2007 departure of Peter Wuffli as CEO.

In November 2018 it was reported that Wuffli had joined the new financial services operator Sygnum as advisor.

In July 2019, Wuffli was nominated to Sygnum's board of directors.

== Other engagements ==
In December 2006, Wuffli and his wife founded The Elea Foundation for Ethics in Globalization.

He is chairman of the board of Partners Group Holding, a board member of the Zurich Opera House, member of the executive committee and chairman of the board of IMD International Institute for Management Development in Lausanne.

He was president of the Friends of the FDP (Freunde der FDP) association, founded 2004 to support the Swiss FDP political party.

== Publications ==
- Liberale Ethik. Orientierungsversuch im Zeitalter der Globalisierung. Stämpfli Verlag, Bern 2010, ISBN 978-3-7272-1308-3
- Inclusive Leadership, A Framework for the Global Era. Springer 2016, ISBN 978-3-319-23560-8

Business positions
Preceded by Marcel Ospel	Group CEO of UBS; 2001 - 2007	Succeeded by Marcel Rohner
