= Howie Hubler =

American trader

- Born: Howard Hubler III; Boonton, New Jersey, U.S.
- Education: Montclair State College
- Occupations: Trader, consultant
- Known for: Trading losses

Howard Hubler III, known as Howie Hubler, is an American former Morgan Stanley bond trader who is best known for his role in the fifth largest trading loss in history. He made a successful short trade in risky subprime mortgages in the U.S., but to fund his trade he sold insurance on AAA-rated mortgage-backed collateralized debt obligations that market analysts considered less risky, but also turned out to be worthless, resulting in a massive net loss on his trades. His actions while handling credit default swaps (CDSs) directly resulted in the loss of roughly US$9 billion during the 2008 financial crisis—the 2nd largest single trading loss in Wall Street history when adjusted for inflation, and the largest at the time. The only bigger single losses in nominal terms came in 2012 with Bruno Iksil (also trading CDSs) and in 2021 when Bill Hwang lost around $10 billion on total return swaps.

== Early life and education ==
Hubler was born and raised in Boonton, New Jersey, the son of a real estate broker. He attended Montclair State College, where he played American football.

== Career ==
Hubler began working in Morgan Stanley's fixed income division as a bond trader sometime in the late 1990s. He had a reputation as a hothead and a bully who responded to critiques with strong anger. In 2003, Morgan Stanley created a proprietary CDS for the purpose of shorting bad subprime mortgage bonds. When a group was being formed in 2003 to short subprime mortgages, Hubler was co-opted as the group's manager and placed in charge of the team. After early successes shorting subprime mortgage bonds, as well as selling bonds, he was promoted to run the newly created Global Proprietary Credit Group (GPCG) in 2006.

=== $9 billion loss ===
The GPCG had positioned itself within Morgan Stanley as a group that could provide highly profitable deals very quickly. Because of the nature of the CDSs, however, the GPCG was required to post premiums to their counter-parties until such a time when the bonds were considered in default. Because the group was paying out a large amount of money to keep the CDS trades in place, their profitability was quite low. To finance their operations, Hubler instructed his traders to sell CDSs on $16 billion in AAA-rated collateralized debt obligations (CDOs). Hubler and the GPCG bought $2 billion in CDSs on extremely risky mortgages, and sold $16 billion in what they believed were safe CDOs. Because of the opaque nature of the CDOs on which they were selling CDSs, Hubler and his group did not realize that the CDOs they were insuring contained subprime mortgages similarly risky to the bonds they were shorting. Because of this, he repeatedly assured his company officers and risk management teams that their position was very secure.

After threatening to quit in a dispute over pay and organizational structure, Hubler was paid $25 million for his performance in 2006 and was expected to make significantly more in 2007 if performance continued as it had. However, once the dispute was resolved, the risk management team asked the GPCG to stress-test their portfolio. At a default rate of 6% (the previous historical high), the portfolio remained solvent. When pushed to a hypothetical default rate of 10%, however, the group's projected profits of $1 billion turned into a projected loss of $2.7 billion. Hubler argued vociferously that such default levels were unlikely and would never happen.

As the housing market began to collapse and defaults on subprime mortgages began to mount, disputes between Hubler's group and their counterparties began to emerge over the value of the bonds and CDOs that had been subject to CDSs. When notified by the counterparties that the CDOs' value had dropped to levels warranting a payout, Hubler disagreed, stating that the GPCG's models indicated that the CDOs were worth most of their expected value. Had he conceded the drop in value earlier, the GPCG's losses may have been limited to a relatively small fraction of their overall risk. However, because of his reluctance to follow the procedures outlined in the CDSs, GPCG and Morgan Stanley's position worsened over the subsequent months. By the time upper management intervened and removed Hubler, GPCG and Morgan Stanley were liable for nearly 100% of the expected losses. Hubler's group managed to sell $5 billion worth of the CDOs they had before the market collapsed, and realized another $2 billion in revenue from their original CDSs, putting the overall losses for his group at $9 billion—the fourth-largest single trading loss in Wall Street history. Morgan Stanley lost $58 billion in the 2008 financial crisis overall.

=== After Morgan Stanley ===
In October 2008, after Morgan Stanley's management and risk teams realized the extent of the damage, Hubler was given the option of resigning instead of being fired. He was paid $10 million on his departure.

In 2008, Hubler started the Loan Value Group, an organization that works with mortgage lenders dealing with underwater borrowers who are considering a strategic default. He has refused all requests to be interviewed on the topic of his time at Morgan Stanley.

In the 2015 Adam McKay film The Big Short, Hubler's story is presented under the pseudonym of a Morgan Stanley trader named "Benny Kleeger".

== See also ==
- List of trading losses
- Kweku Adoboli lost $2 billion for UBS
- Jérôme Kerviel
- Nick Leeson caused a loss of £827 million for Barings Bank, leading to its collapse
- Yasuo Hamanaka caused a loss of about $2.6 billion, over ten years, in unauthorized copper trading on the London Metal Exchange
