= Oil futures drunk-trading incident =

2009 event that cause significant fluctuation in oil prices

In the early morning of 30 June 2009, Steven Perkins, an employee of London-based PVM Oil Futures, traded 7 million barrels (1.1 million cubic metres) of oil – worth approximately US$520 million (£340 million) – while drunk. These unauthorised trades caused the price of Brent Crude oil to rise by over $1.50 a barrel (equivalent to $2.25 in 2025) within a short period of time, a trend generally associated with major geopolitical events, before dropping rapidly. As a result of the trading, PVM Oil Futures suffered losses of almost $10 million and Perkins was dismissed, later being banned from trading by the Financial Services Authority (FSA).

== Background ==
Steven Perkins, an employee of PVM Oil Futures since 1998, was a Brent Crude broker in the London-based company's international commodities futures division. As part of his duties, he traded in futures for clients; he was not allowed to trade using PVM's money.

== Trading ==
On 29 June 2009, after spending a weekend drinking heavily, Perkins returned to London from a company-sponsored golf weekend and continued drinking at around midday. Around this time, he made some trades, which he said were for a client. According to Perkins, later that day he suffered an alcohol-induced blackout. Beginning at 1:22 a.m. (UTC+1) on 30 June 2009, while still blacked-out, Perkins traded 7 million bbl (1.1 million m^{3}), worth $500 million (£340 million); at times this represented 69% of the volume of oil then being traded and ten times the average trade volume. He made his last trade at 3:41 a.m., approximately two and a half hours later.

Perkins sent a text message to his boss stating that he was feeling ill at approximately 6:30 a.m. He was later contacted at 7:45 a.m. by an administrative clerk at PVM, who enquired about the early-morning trades. Perkins replied that he had spent the night assisting a client with trading. However, by 10:00 a.m. his claim had been disproved and PVM attempted to rid themselves of the futures.

== Aftermath ==
Perkins's trading left PVM Oil Futures holding "substantial volumes" of futures, which cost the company $9,763,252 to honour; at the time, PVM's annual income was only $12 million. That year PVM saw a loss of $7.6 million.

The cost of oil worldwide rose from $71.40 per barrel to $73.50 per barrel, the highest in eight months, before the trend reversed sharply; the total increase due to Perkins's trading was more than $1.50 per barrel, which is generally only caused by major events with geopolitical significance. For comparison, a $2-per-barrel increase would have cost $175 million worldwide.

Iain Gilligan, the Head of Compliance at PVM, had no previous experience of trading or broking in any financial or commodity markets, having joined PVM directly from the Army a few years previously. He disregarded the importance of the compliance function, which had been underlined by the 2008 financial crisis. As Head of Compliance Gilligan was responsible for implementing and rigorously monitoring effective control systems to ensure trades were correctly matched, allocated and verified in a timely manner. His failure to set in place appropriate internal controls resulted in the whole series of trades remaining unquestioned and unverified for many hours.

After an investigation by the FSA, which deemed Perkins "not fit and proper", he was barred from working as a trader in June 2010 for a minimum of five years and fined a total of £72,000 – paid in 36 installments – which was reduced from £150,000 after Perkins expressed concern that the large fine would cause him undue financial hardship. When delivering the report, a regulator for the FSA said that "Mr. Perkins poses an extreme risk to the market when drunk".

As a result of Perkins' trading, he was suspended in July 2009. That same month, he joined an alcoholics' rehabilitation programme. In July 2010, two days after the FSA announced the sanctions, Perkins was hired by Starsupply Renewables SA, a Swiss-based biofuels brokerage company, initially to create training manuals for new recruits; Starsupply promised not to allow Perkins to trade for the remainder of his probation. A spokesperson for Starsupply stated that they considered him "a good man who did a stupid thing".

== See also ==
- Rogue trader
