= Error account =

In accounting, a type of account

An error account is a type of account used for storing compensation for errors in trading, a transaction that is not posted in a timely manner because of inconsistencies, such as an incorrect account or routing numbers to the wrong name on the account, producing a claim that needs to be resolved as soon as possible so payments can be made.

== Transaction processing ==
When many hundreds or thousands of transactions are being done each day, and whenever there is human input involved, error accounts are necessary to keep the audit trail intact. Error accounts also play a role in improving customer service. GAAP recommends daily or weekly monitoring of error accounts depending on volume and transaction size. It is typically up to the company or applicable government department's accounting department to monitor the error accounts that it has in place.

In 1994, Nick Leeson used a poorly monitored error account at Barings Bank in an attempt to cover up evidence of his trading losses and place ever larger unauthorized trades to win back the money. In doing so, he lost over £800 million and bankrupted his employer.

Error accounts can be implemented in manual accounting as well, but this is much less common in the developed world since personal computers became commonplace.

== See also ==
- Accounting standard
- International Financial Reporting Standards
- International Accounting Standards Board
- Transaction processing
