= Marcel Rohner (banker) =

Swiss businessman (born 1964)

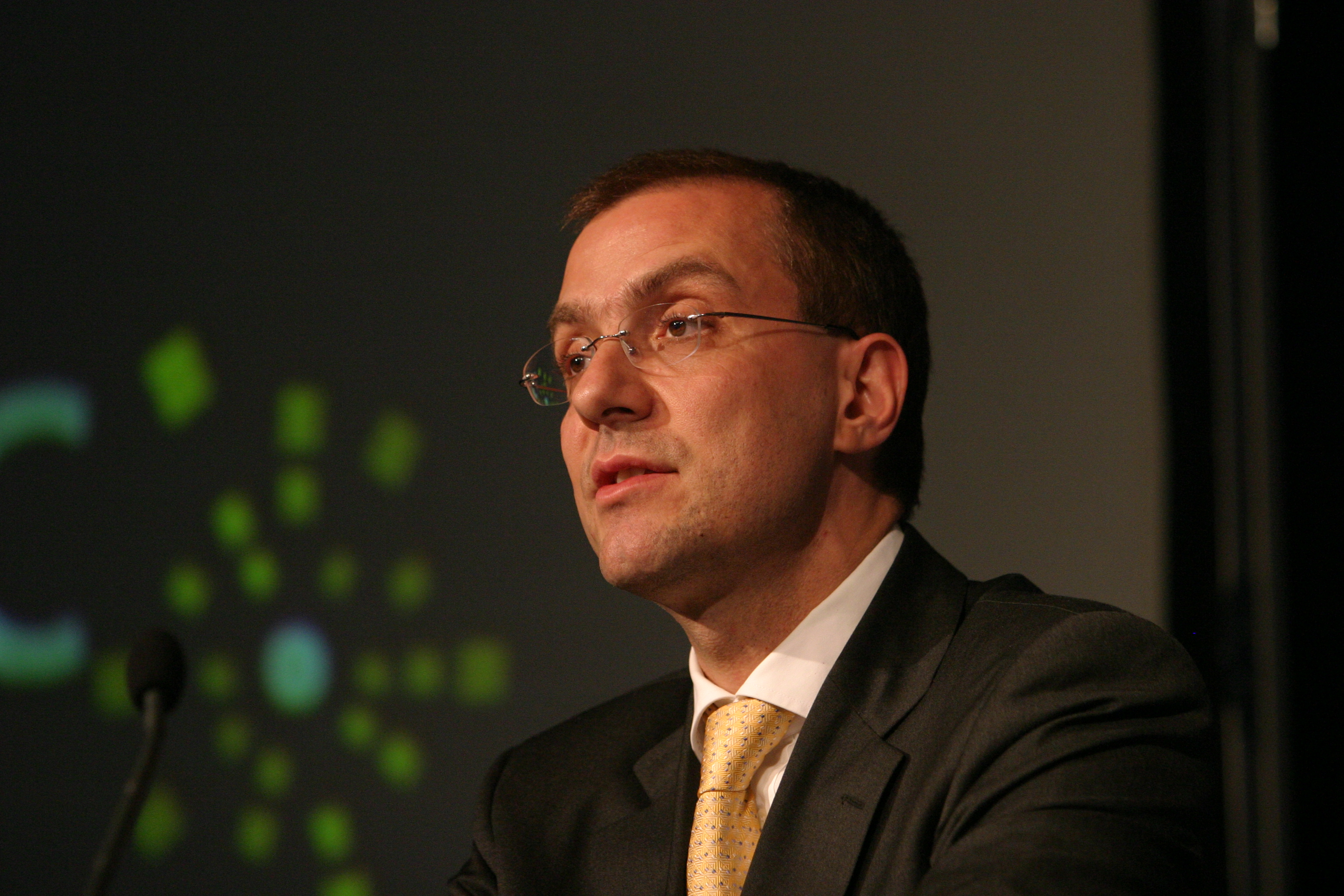
- Rohner in 2004
- Born: Marcel Rohner; 4 September 1964 (age 61); Aarau, Aargau, Switzerland
- Education: Old Cantonal School Aarau
- Alma mater: University of Zürich (PhD)
- Occupations: Vice president of Union Bancaire Privée and chairman of Swiss Bankers Association
- Known for: Former group chief executive officer of UBS AG
- Spouse: Gabriela 'Gaby' Lüthy
- Children: 2

Marcel Rohner (born 4 September 1964) is a Swiss businessman and banker. Rohner was group chief executive officer (Group CEO) at UBS AG from 6 July 2007 until 26 February 2009, and on the group executive board from October 2007 until his resignation. Since 2016, he serves as vice president of Union Bancaire Privée, and since 2021 as chairman of the Swiss Bankers Association. Rohner is an ally of Thomas Matter and holds a 5% stake of Helvetische Bank AG.

== Early life and education ==
Rohner was born 4 September 1964 in Aarau, Switzerland, a son of Hans and Helen (née Kraus) Rohner, and was raised in Küttigen, a small municipality, where he attended the local schools. His mother was a member of the District Court Aarau and a representative for the Christian Democratic People's Party. He completed his Matura Typus E at Old Cantonal School Aarau. Rohner graduated with a Ph.D. in Economics from the University of Zurich and was a research and teaching assistant at the Institute for Empirical Research in Economics at the University of Zurich from 1990 to 1992.

== Career ==
Between 1993 and 1998, Rohner was with Swiss Bank Corporation’s Investment Banking branch, where in 1995 he was appointed Head of Market Risk Control Europe. In 1998, he worked as Head of Market Risk Control of Warburg Dillon Read. In 1999, he was promoted to Group Chief Risk Officer.

In 2001, he became chief operating officer and deputy CEO of the private Banking Unit of UBS Switzerland. Between 2002 and 2007 he was CEO of Wealth Management & Business Banking, and additionally named chairman in 2004. Rohner was appointed Deputy Group CEO in January 2006. On 26 February 2009 it was announced that Marcel Rohner had resigned from UBS AG. He was succeeded by Oswald Grübel as the new CEO. Rohner was vice chairman of the Swiss Bankers Association in Basel until 2008, and the vice chairman of the board of trustees of The Swiss Finance Institute. In 2013, Rohner was accused of "staggering ignorance" by the Banking Standards Commission over Libor rigging.

Since 2016, Rohner serves as vice president of Union Bancaire Privée. He is also chairman of the Swiss Bankers Association since 2021. Rohner currently also chairs Warteck Invest AG and Löwenfeld AG and is a board member of CBI Holding SA.

== Personal life ==
He is married and has two children. They reside in Aarau, Switzerland.

Business positions
| Preceded by Peter Wuffli | Group CEO of UBS AG; 2007–2009 | Succeeded by Oswald Grübel |
