= Jérôme Kerviel =

French trader (born 1977)

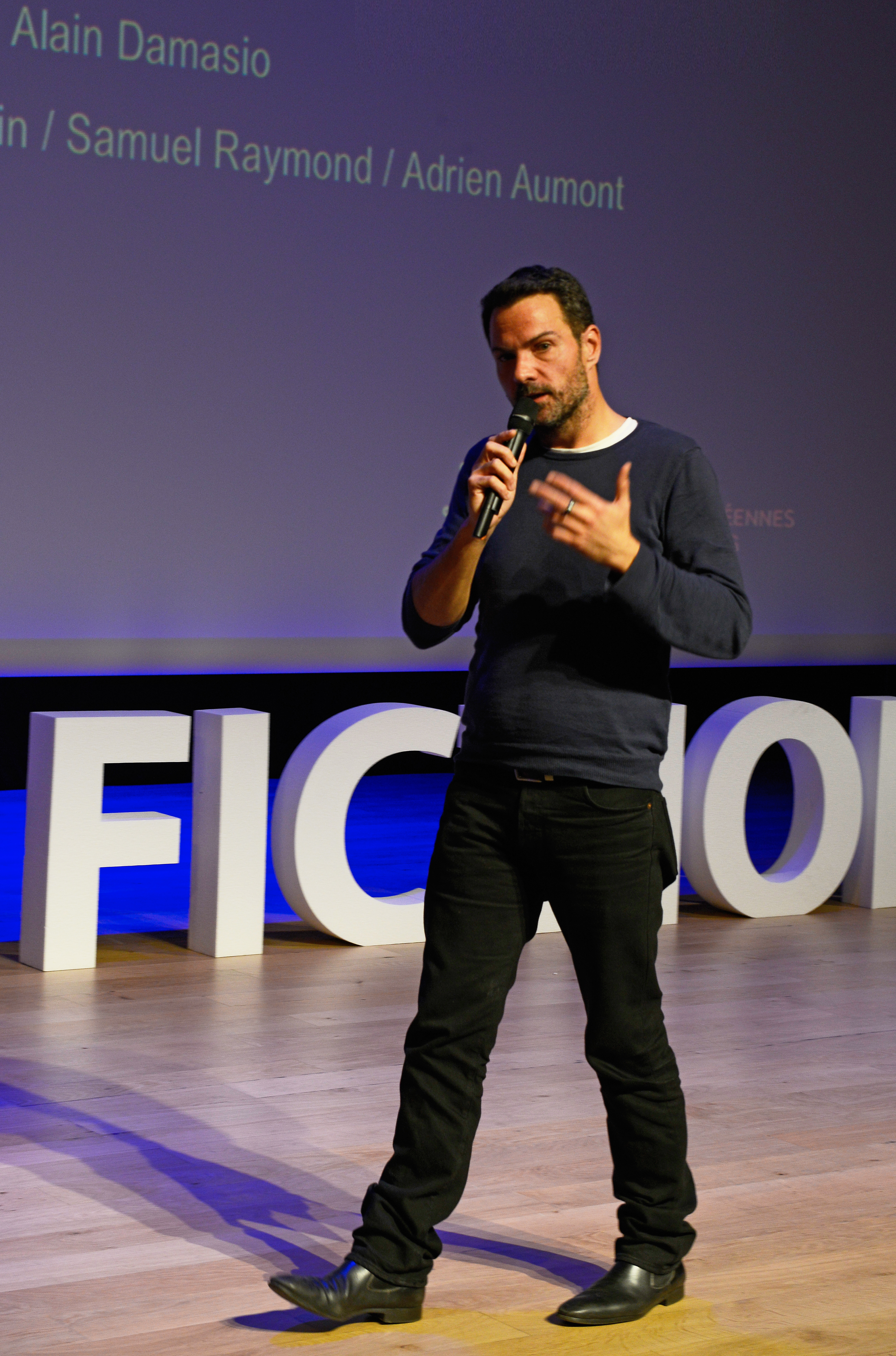
- Kerviel in 2015
- Born: 11 January 1977 (age 49); Pont-l'Abbé, Finistère, France
- Education: Lumière University Lyon 2 (Master of Finance); University of Nantes
- Occupations: Trader, consultant
- Employer(s): Société Générale (formerly); Lemaire Consultants (currently)
- Criminal charges: Abuse of confidence illegal access to computers
- Criminal penalty: Three years in prison

Jérôme Kerviel (French pronunciation: [ʒeʁom kɛʁvjɛl]; born 11 January 1977) is a French trader who was convicted and imprisoned in the 2008 Société Générale trading loss for breach of trust, forgery and unauthorized use of the bank's computers, resulting in losses valued at €4.9 billion.

== Early life ==
Kerviel grew up Pont-l'Abbé, Brittany. His mother, Marie-Josée, is a retired hairdresser, and his father, Charles, was a blacksmith. He has an older brother, Olivier. Kerviel was married, but he and his wife separated in 2008.

Kerviel graduated in 2000 from Lumière University Lyon 2 with a Master of Finance specializing in organization and control of financial markets. The university's financial program, which was initiated in the 1990s with the support of France's larger banks, was intended to prepare students for middle and back office positions in the trading departments of financial institutions. Prior to that he received a bachelor's degree in finance from the University of Nantes.

During an interview, one of Kerviel's former lecturers at Lyon, Gisèle Reynaud, stated that Kerviel "was a student just like the others, a young man, and he didn't distinguish himself from the others." In 2001, at the suggestion of Thierry Mavic, the mayor of Pont l'Abbé, Kerviel stood for a seat on the local council with the Union for a Popular Movement but was not elected.

== Société Générale ==
Kerviel joined the middle office of the bank Société Générale (SocGen) in the summer of 2000, working in its compliance department. In 2005 he was promoted to the bank's delta one products team in Paris, where he was a junior trader. SocGen's Delta One business includes program trading, exchange-traded funds, swaps, index futures and quantitative trading. Christian Noyer, governor of the Bank of France, has described Kerviel as a "computer genius"; however, sources within Société Générale described Kerviel as "not a star". Kerviel earned a bonus of €60,000 on top of a €74,000 salary in 2006, considered modest compared to the salaries paid to traders in the financial markets. He had hoped for a €600,000 bonus for 2007 and would have received at least half that amount.

=== Unauthorized trading ===
SocGen states that Kerviel was assigned to arbitrage discrepancies between equity derivatives and cash equity prices, and "began creating the fictitious trades in late 2006 and early 2007, but that these transactions were relatively small. The fake trading increased in frequency, and in size". Bank officials claim that throughout 2007, he had been trading profitably in anticipation of falling market prices; however, they have accused him of exceeding his authority to engage in unauthorized trades totaling as much as €49.9 billion, a figure far higher than the bank's total market capitalization. Kerviel tried to conceal the activity by creating losing trades intentionally so as to offset his early gains. According to the BBC, Kerviel generated €1.4 billion in hidden profits at the beginning of 2008. His employers say they uncovered unauthorized trading traced to Kerviel on 19 January 2008. SocGen then closed out these positions over three days of trading beginning 21 January 2008, a period after which the market experienced a large drop in equity indices, and losses attributed are estimated at €4.9 billion ($7 billion).

SocGen claimed Kerviel "had taken massive fraudulent directional positions in 2007 and 2008 far beyond his limited authority" and that the trades involved European stock index futures. Though SocGen officials say Kerviel apparently worked alone, skeptics question how unauthorized trading of this magnitude could go unnoticed. Kerviel's unassuming background and position have heightened the skepticism that he worked alone. Some analysts suggest that unauthorised trading of this scale may have gone unnoticed initially due to the high volume in low-risk trades normally conducted by his department. SocGen said that whenever the fake trades were questioned, Kerviel would describe it as a mistake then cancel the trade, after which he would replace that trade with another transaction using a different instrument to avoid detection. Kerviel's lawyers, Elisabeth Meyer and Christian Charrière-Bournazel, said that SocGen's managers "brought the loss on themselves"; accused them of wanting to "raise a smokescreen to divert public attention from far more substantial losses in the last few months"; and said that Kerviel had made the bank a profit of US$2 billion as of 31 December 2007.

SocGen managers have described some of the means Kerviel employed to avoid the bank's internal controls and escape detection. Executive Chairman Daniel Bouton describes the pattern as like "a mutating virus", in which hundreds of thousands of trades were hidden behind offsetting faked hedge trades. Officials say Kerviel was careful to close the trades in just two or three days, just before the trades' timed controls would trigger notice from the bank's internal control system, and Kerviel would then shift those older positions to newly initiated trades. Experts have expressed skepticism of SocGen's account, saying that a pattern of closing out trades within the three-day cycle alleged could not be accomplished given the immense sums involved.

Kerviel is not thought to have profited personally from the suspicious trades. Prosecutors say Kerviel has been cooperative with the investigation, and has told them his actions were also practiced by other traders in SocGen. Kerviel admits to exceeding his credit limits, but claims he was working to increase bank profits. He told authorities that the bank was happy with his previous year's performance, and was expecting to be paid a €300,000 bonus on a €60 million declared profit (approximately 0.5%). Family members speaking out say SocGen was using Kerviel as a scapegoat to excuse its recent heavy losses.

=== Legal repercussions ===
In answer to the rumors that Kerviel had fled Paris following the discovery of the unauthorised trading, on 24 January 2008 Kerviel's lawyer denied that he attempted to disappear and said he remained in Paris to face the accusations. That same day, SocGen filed a lawsuit against "a 31-year-old person" for creating fraudulent documents, using forged documents and making attacks on an automated system, according to Clarisse Grillon, a spokeswoman for the Nanterre prosecutor. Le Figaro reported that in addition to the SocGen lawsuit, a group of shareholders filed a lawsuit for fraud, breach of trust and forgery.

Around 25 January 2008, police raided the Paris headquarters of SocGen and Kerviel's apartment in the western suburb of Neuilly-sur-Seine to seize his computer files. On 26 January 2008, the Paris prosecutors' office stated that Kerviel "is not on the run. He will be questioned at the appropriate time, as soon as the police have analysed documents provided by Société Générale." He was taken into police custody later that day.

Kerviel's initial 24-hour detention was extended to 48 hours while French law enforcement questioned him about possible accomplices. The investigation later widened to encompass his personal cell phone records, and to explore possible links to other individuals working at rival banks and private investment firms who may have been involved. The police were investigating whether Kerviel worked alone, and whether any investors outside of SocGen may have been tipped off in advance. Police were interested whether others were involved, either in the trades themselves, or whether they received notice of the bank's impending sell-off before the details of the scandal were publicly disclosed.

Kerviel was formally charged on 28 January 2008 with abuse of confidence and illegal access to computers. He was released from custody a short time after. The charges filed carry a maximum three-year prison term. On 29 January 2008 investigating judges Renaud van Ruymbeke and Françoise Desset had rejected prosecutor Jean-Claude Marin's bid to charge Kerviel with the more serious crime of "attempted fraud" and refuse bail.

Kerviel's trial began on 8 June 2010. On 5 October, he was found guilty and sentenced to five years of prison, with two years suspended, full restitution of the $6.7 billion which was lost, and a permanent ban from working in financial services. Caroline Guillaumin, a spokeswoman for SocGen, stated that the restitution was "symbolic", and that the bank had no expectation that the sum would be paid. Olivier Metzner, Kerviel's lawyer, described the sentence as "extraordinary" and said that Kerviel would appeal. Kerviel's sentence was suspended until his appeal was completed.

On 24 October 2012, a Paris appeals court upheld the October 2010 sentence to three years in prison with another two suspended, and ordered Kerviel to reimburse 4.9 billion euros to SocGen for its loss. In March 2014, a French high court upheld Kerviel's prison sentence but ruled he would not have to repay €4.9bn.

On 7 June 2016, the Court of Appeal of Versailles condemned SocGen for their unlawful firing of Kerviel. Société Générale said it would appeal.

== Lemaire Consultants ==
In April 2008, following Kerviel's provisional release, he was hired by Lemaire Consultants & Associates, an information systems and computer security consulting firm.

== Pilgrimage ==
While awaiting a ruling on his legal appeal and still protesting SocGen's stance in his case, Kerviel met with Pope Francis outside the Vatican on 19 February 2014, and undertook a pilgrimage from Rome to Paris against the "tyranny of the markets".

== Release from prison ==
On 8 September 2014, Kerviel was released from Fleury Merogis prison having served fewer than five months of detention. He was to begin a job with an IT consultancy firm.

== References to Jérôme Kerviel ==
Among the several French media referencing Kerviel, there is a movie Team Spirit released in 2016.

== See also ==
- Nick Leeson
- Toshihide Iguchi
- Kweku Adoboli
- Bruno Iksil
- Howie Hubler
- List of trading losses
