= Delta one =

Financial derivatives with no optionality

Delta one products are financial derivatives that have no optionality and as such have a delta of (or very close to) one – meaning that for a given instantaneous move in the price of the underlying asset there is expected to be an identical move in the price of the derivative. Delta one products can sometimes be synthetically assembled by combining options. For instance, you can be long a forward on WTI crude oil at price X by buying an X strike call and selling an X strike put. This is known as put call parity. Delta one products often incorporate a number of underlying securities and thus give the holder an easy way to gain exposure to a basket of securities in a single product.

== Delta ==
The delta measures the sensitivity of a derivative's value to changes in the price of the underlying asset. The delta (Δ) of an instrument is the first mathematical derivative of the derivative's value with respect to the underlier's price.

== Trading desks ==
Delta one trading desks are either part of the equity finance or equity derivatives divisions of most major investment banks. They generate most revenue through a variety of strategies related to the various delta one products as well as related activities, such as dividend trading, equity financing and equity index arbitrage. FT Alphaville has described delta one trading as "one of the hottest areas in banking" and "...the last domain of prop trading in the banking sector, where via market-making activities, traders can still get away with taking ample risks." The Financial Times also describes delta one desks as akin to the special forces of trading.

== Types of products ==
A delta one product is a derivative with a linear, symmetric payoff profile. That is, a derivative that is not an option or a product with embedded options. Examples of delta one products are Exchange-traded funds, equity swaps, custom baskets, linear certificates, futures, forwards, exchange-traded notes, trackers, and Forward rate agreements. As the price for these products closely track their underlying asset and the risk free rate, their delta will be close to 1.

Two high-profile cases of losses resulting from rogue trading (those of Jérôme Kerviel at Société Générale and Kweku Adoboli at UBS) involved delta one traders.
