= Kweku Adoboli =

Ghanaian-born British trader convicted of fraud

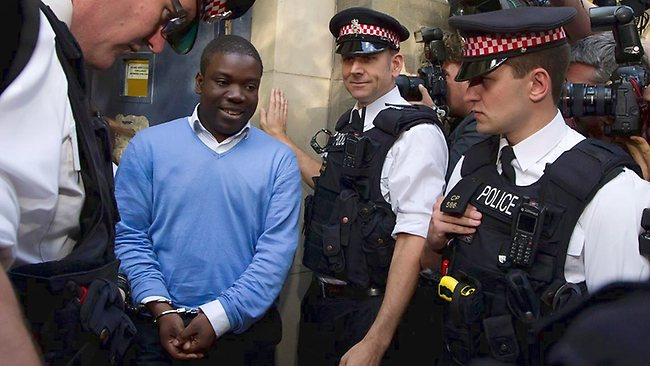
- Adoboli in September 2011
- Born: 21 May 1980 (age 46); Tema, Greater Accra Region, Ghana
- Education: University of Nottingham (BSc)
- Occupations: Investment manager; Stock trader
- Known for: 2011 UBS rogue trader scandal

Kweku Adoboli (born 21 May 1980) is a Ghanaian investment manager and former stock trader. He was convicted of illegally trading away US$2 billion (£1.3 billion) as a trader for Swiss investment bank UBS. While at the bank he primarily worked on UBS' Global Synthetic Equities Trading team in London, where he engaged in what would later be known as the 2011 UBS rogue trader scandal. After serving a prison sentence, he lost several appeals against the UK Home Office decision to deport him to Ghana.

== Early life and education ==
Kweku Adoboli was born on 21 May 1980 in Tema, Ghana, to John Adoboli, a senior United Nations official. He spent his early years in Israel, Syria and Iraq, before moving to the United Kingdom in 1991. He attended Ackworth School in Pontefract, West Yorkshire, where he was head boy. In 2000, after finishing school, he started reading Chemical Engineering at the University of Nottingham, but switched to e-commerce and digital business studies. In 2000, he was elected as Communications Officer of University of Nottingham Students' Union. In mid-2002, he worked as a summer intern at UBS's operations department. He graduated from Nottingham in July 2003 with a Bachelor of Science in Computing and Business Management.

== Career ==
Adoboli joined UBS's London office as a graduate trainee in September 2003. After working for two years as a trading analyst in the bank's back office, he was promoted to a Delta One trading desk. In 2008, he became a director on the exchange-traded fund (ETF) desk, and by 2010 was promoted to director, with a total annual salary of almost £200,000. Beginning in 2008, he started using the bank's money for unauthorised trades. He entered false information into UBS's computers to hide the risky trades he was making. He exceeded the bank's per-employee daily trading limit of US$100 million, and failed to hedge his trades against risk. He also used his personal funds on two spread betting accounts, IG Index and City Index, where he lost around £100,000.

In mid-2011, UBS launched an internal investigation into Adoboli's trades. On 14 September 2011, he wrote an email to his manager admitting the false trades, which cost the bank US$2.2 billion (£1.4 billion) and wiped off US$4.5 billion (£2.7 billion) from its share price. They were the largest unauthorised trading losses in British history.

After his deportation to Ghana, Adoboli hoped to start a new career in finance.

== Charges and conviction ==
On 15 September 2011, Adoboli was arrested by City of London Police and charged with two counts of fraud by abuse of position and four counts of false accounting. He was in prison on remand until 8 June 2012, when he was granted bail subject to being electronically tagged and placed under curfew at a friend's house. On the morning of 20 November 2012, a jury at Southwark Crown Court unanimously found him guilty on one count of fraud. Later that day, after receiving an instruction allowing for a majority decision with a single vote against, the jury found him guilty of a second count of fraud. They found him not guilty on the four false-accounting charges. He was sentenced to seven years in prison. The City of London Police said: "This was the UK's biggest fraud, committed by one of the most sophisticated fraudsters the City of London Police has ever come across."

== Imprisonment and subsequent appeal against deportation ==
Adoboli served out his sentence at HMP The Verne in Dorset, HMP Ford in West Sussex, and HMP Maidstone in Kent. He was released in June 2015. Despite living in the United Kingdom since 1991, he had never become a British citizen, and was thus liable for automatic deportation under Section 32 of the UK Borders Act 2007 as a foreign criminal who had been sentenced to at least 12 months of imprisonment. He was served with deportation proceedings in July 2015, and stayed with friends in London and Edinburgh. After his release he gave many talks to students, financial traders and others in the banking industry on operating ethically and avoiding the mistakes he made.

Adoboli lost his original appeal against the Home Secretary's order of deportation made against him in July 2016, and continued to appeal. He was eventually denied permission for a judicial review and his deportation was scheduled for September 2018. He stated that he believed his deportation was due to the Home Office hostile environment policy on immigration. However, Home Office officials stated that their actions, and the underlying decision, were matters of longstanding government policy, supported by the law. Adoboli was deported to his native Ghana on 14 November 2018 after his appeals against deportation were turned down.

== See also ==
- Yasuo Hamanaka caused a loss of about US$2.6 billion, over ten years, in unauthorised copper trading on the London Metal Exchange
- Howie Hubler lost US$9 billion in one CDS trade for Morgan Stanley, the largest single loss in history
- Jérôme Kerviel, trader with Société Générale who lost approximately €4.9 billion
- Nick Leeson caused a loss of £827 million for Barings Bank, leading to its collapse
- Bill Hwang lost US$20 billion after Archegos Capital Management, his family office, defaulted on multiple margin calls
- List of trading losses
