= Toshihide Iguchi =

Japanese rogue trader (1951–2019)

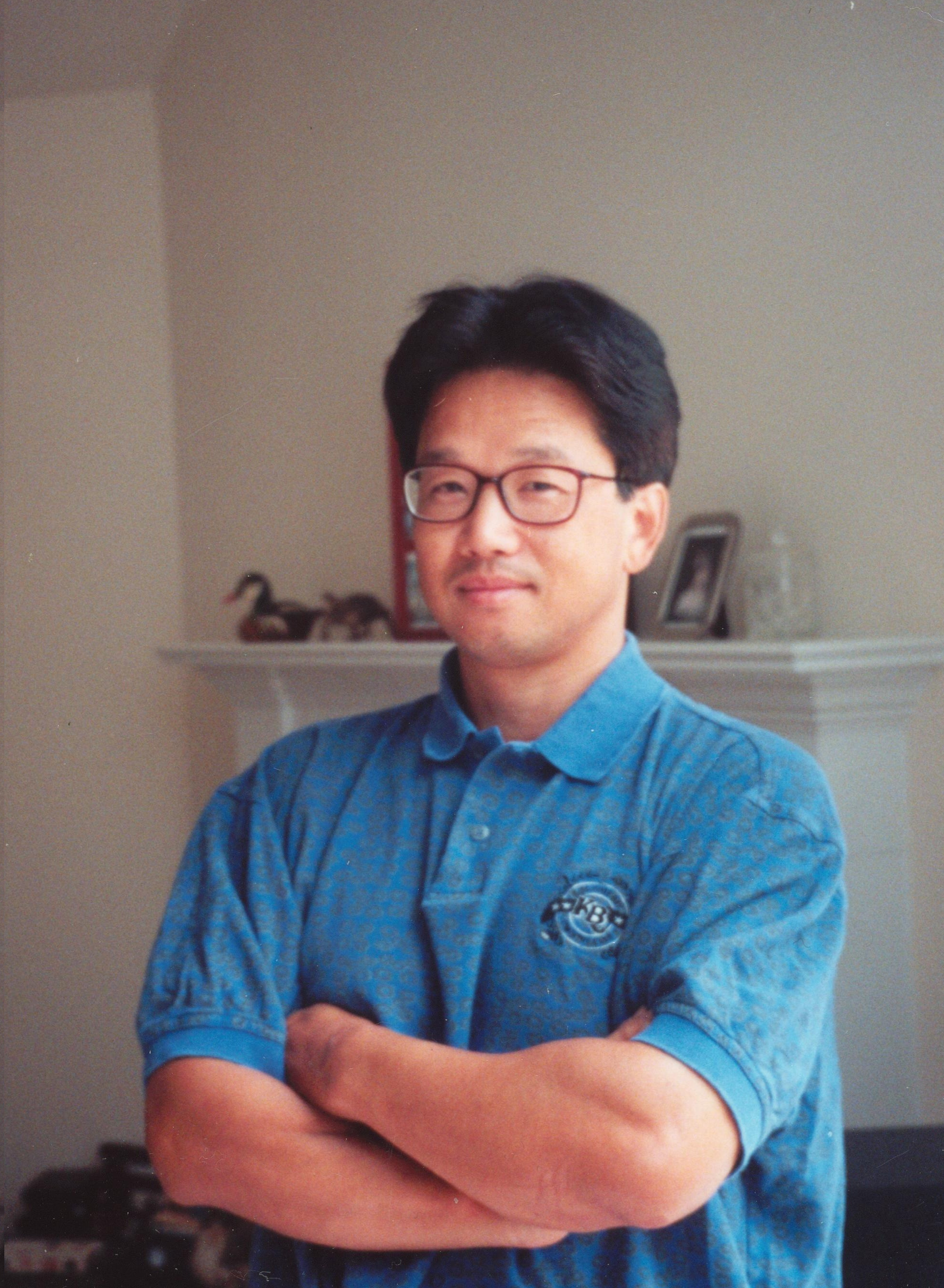
- Born: March 10, 1951; Himeji, Japan
- Died: April 6, 2019 (aged 68)
- Education: Missouri State University
- Occupations: Trader; Author, Speaker, Foreign language technology developer
- Employer(s): Daiwa Bank; SpeakGlobal, Ltd.
- Known for: Rogue trading

Toshihide Isamu Iguchi (井口俊英) (1951–2019) was an Executive VP and U.S. Government Bond trader at Daiwa Bank's New York Branch, who was responsible for $1.1 billion in unauthorized trading losses accumulated over a period of 12 years beginning in 1983.

== Early life ==
Toshihide Iguchi was born to Isamu and Tsuneko Iguchi in Himeji, Japan. Toshihide has an older sister, Kazuyo, who lives in Kobe.

Iguchi moved to the U.S. at age 19 to spend a few months with his father who was living in New York whilst temporarily on business. Enchanted with America, he decided to go to college there and enrolled in Southwest Missouri State College (now called Missouri State University) where he majored in psychology. He married Romamaria Testa, and worked as a truck salesman at a local Chevrolet dealer during his college years.

== Career ==
After graduating, he was hired at Daiwa's New York branch to work in the Securities Custody Department. In 1980, he was also given the role of a portfolio manager.

In 1983, he lost $70,000 trading Federal Reserve Notes (FRN) but concealed this loss to protect his reputation and job. He continued trading, attempting to recoup the loss; however, the loss snowballed. Meanwhile, the Securities Custody Department expanded to the largest department of Daiwa's New York Branch as the Japanese investment in U.S. securities soared. Iguchi's area was producing more than 50% of the Branch's profits. While he was managing the fastest growing division of Daiwa's international division, his clandestine trading operation escalated to recoup ever deepening losses.

In July 1989, Iguchi and his two junior traders made a $3 billion bet on U.S. Treasury Bonds and lost $350 million. Immediately after this incident, as a result of whistle-blowing by one of the dealers, the New York Fed sent an examiner to look into Daiwa's bond trading operation, but found nothing.

In 1991, the downtown Securities Custody Department moved to the World Financial Center with a new trading room. It was a bold move because the downtown office was approved by New York State Banking Department as a custody operation center only. Shortly after, Iguchi was promoted to Executive Vice President of the New York Branch. In 1992, during a New York Fed examination, Daiwa concealed the trading operation in its downtown office from the examiners by relocating the bond traders to the Branch's main office in midtown.

In 1993, on the advice of its lawyers, Daiwa voluntarily confessed to its falsehood and assured the Fed it was not concealing any impropriety. The Fed conducted a thorough investigation of the operation of the downtown office for two weeks but found nothing unusual. After six months of deliberations at the Federal Reserve Board in Washington, Daiwa received a formal reprimand for their trickery. It said,

"Daiwa engineered trickery in hopes of deceiving the Fed examiner and made false statements. Daiwa's act is a violation of 18 U.S.C. 1005. The Federal Reserve Board hereby requests the management of Daiwa here and in Japan never to engage in this sort of unethical conduct again."

The Ministry of Finance in Japan dispatched a group of examiners to check the Daiwa New York Branch following this news, but found no irregularities. Despite this incident, both the New York Fed and the Ministry of Finance (MOF), the highest regulatory authorities in the US and Japan, could not detect Iguchi's more than $1 billion loss.

In September 1995, fearing the damage his losses may cause the bank if inadvertently discovered, Iguchi wrote a confession letter to the president of Daiwa Bank, Japan, describing what had transpired with the complete details of all the unauthorized trades he had done during the previous 12 years. By this time, the losses were in excess of $1 billion. According to Iguchi, concealing this loss to protect his reputation and job was the impetus for his subsequent unauthorized trading.

Upon receiving this confession letter, Daiwa instructed Iguchi to continue concealing the loss and assist other bank officers in verifying the loss. Two weeks later, Daiwa reported the loss to its regulator, the MOF, which instructed Daiwa not to disclose it for two more months as they were scheduled to announce two major bank failures. Japan was in the midst of the worst financial crisis since the Great Depression, following the burst of the economic bubble of the 1980s. However, Daiwa's US lawyers strongly advised Daiwa to report the loss to the US regulators and on September 18, unbeknownst to Iguchi, Daiwa reported the loss and submitted a criminal referral form on Iguchi along with his confession letter. Meanwhile, Iguchi, who was completely kept in the dark, was working day and night to verify the loss, until he was arrested at his home in New Jersey. With his confession letter in the hands of the FBI, Iguchi had no choice but to admit authoring the letter.

== Imprisonment ==
He was incarcerated at the Metropolitan Correctional Center, New York City, for 15 months, befriending George Harp (a founding member of the Aryan Brotherhood), Greg Scarpa (a Mafia hitman), Mousa Abu Marzook (a Hamas leader) and Latin Kings members. During his incarceration, Iguchi penned a memoir of his life in America in Japanese and while he was still imprisoned, the book became a #1 bestseller in Japan.

In 1997, he was sentenced to four years in prison and sent to Allenwood Prison Camp (Federal Correctional Institute, Allenwood) to serve the remainder of his term. There he wrote another book about George Harp, the only surviving founding-member of the Aryan Brotherhood, titled King of the Prison, which was published in Japan.

In March 1999, he was released from Allenwood FPC.

== Life after prison ==
In August 2000, Iguchi moved to Atlanta, Georgia to begin his new life as a writer. In April 2001, Iguchi published The Dollar Conspiracy in Japan from Bungeishunju. In May 2002, Iguchi wrote an unpublished book, titled My Billion Dollar Education, an English version of his best-selling book, Confession. An updated version, My Billion Dollar Education: Inside the Mind of a Rogue Trader, was published in April 2014.

In July 2007, Iguchi returned to his hometown of Kobe. He worked in the area of foreign language education, developing digital solutions using artificial intelligence for conversation practice. He continued to write and appear publicly for speaking engagements on the topics of trader psychology, shattering rogue finance myths, the role of banks and regulators, and how banks can reduce the risk of rogue trading situations. On 29 April 2014, he appeared on CNBC's Squawk Box Asia and was interviewed by Bernie Lo and Susan Li to discuss My Billion Dollar Education: Inside the Mind of a Rogue Trader, and the opportunistic corporate culture that facilitates rogue trading situations.

Iguchi died of cancer on April 6, 2019.

== See also ==
- List of trading losses
