= Yasuo Hamanaka =

Japanese copper trader and convicted criminal

Yasuo Hamanaka (浜中 泰男, Hamanaka Yasuo) (born 1950) is a former chief copper trader at Sumitomo Corporation, one of the largest trading companies in Japan. He was known as "Mr. Copper" because of his aggressive trading style, and as "Mr. Five Percent" because that is how much of the world's yearly supply he controlled.

On June 13, 1996, Sumitomo Corporation reported a loss of US$1.8 billion in unauthorized copper trading by Hamanaka on the London Metal Exchange. His culpability as to whether this responsibility was authorized is in doubt.

In September 1996, Sumitomo disclosed that the company's financial losses were much higher, at $2.6 billion (285 billion yen).

Hamanaka was sentenced to eight years in prison in 1998 and was released in July 2005, one year early.

== See also ==
- Kweku Adoboli lost $2 billion for UBS
- Jérôme Kerviel
- Nick Leeson caused a loss of £827 million for Barings Bank, leading to its collapse
- List of trading losses
- Sumitomo copper affair
