= Nick Leeson =

English former derivatives trader and fraudster (born 1967)

- Born: Nicholas William Leeson; 25 February 1967 (age 59); Watford, Hertfordshire, England
- Education: Parmiter's School
- Occupations: CEO of Irish football club Galway United (former); Derivatives broker (former); Head Educator at Bizintra (former); CEO of Bull and Bear Capital (current); Financial misconduct investigator at Red Mist Market Enforcement Unit (current)
- Spouses: Lisa Sims (m. 1992; div. 1997); Leona Tormay (m. 2003)
- Website: nickleeson.com

Nicholas William Leeson (born 25 February 1967) is an English former derivatives trader whose fraudulent, unauthorised and speculative trades resulted in the 1995 collapse of Barings Bank, the United Kingdom's oldest existing merchant bank. He was convicted of financial crime in a Singapore court and served more than four years in Changi Prison.

Between 2005 and 2011, Leeson had senior management roles at League of Ireland football club Galway United. After it suffered financial difficulties, he resigned from his position as chief executive officer (CEO). He is also active on the keynote and after-dinner speaking circuit, where he advises companies about risk and corporate responsibility. Since 2023, he has been a private investigator dealing with cases of financial misconduct.

== Early life ==
Nick Leeson was born in Watford, Hertfordshire, to working-class parents on a council estate. His father was a self-employed plasterer, his mother a nurse. He attended Kingsway Junior School and then Parmiter's School in nearby Garston. After finishing sixth form in 1985 with six O Levels and two A level passes, Leeson was hired as a clerk with the Lombard Street branch of the Coutts private bank, where he settled paper cheques, crediting and debiting client accounts.

In 1987, Leeson moved to Morgan Stanley's Futures and Options back office, clearing and settling listed derivatives transactions. With few prospects for a front office role, he joined Barings Bank two years later, on a salary of £12,000 (equivalent to £34,712 in 2025) a year. With four other settlement specialists, Leeson was briefly seconded to Hong Kong to troubleshoot Barings' back office in the Indonesian capital of Jakarta. He was then transferred to Barings' Jakarta office in 1990, handling some of Barings' unpaid share certificates which amounted to £100 million. Leeson returned to London in September 1991 to investigate a case of fraud in which a Barings employee had used a client's account to trade on a proprietary basis until margin calls from the clearinghouses unraveled the scheme.

== Career ==
=== Barings Bank ===
In April 1992, Barings decided to open a Futures and Options office in Singapore, executing and clearing transactions on the Singapore International Monetary Exchange (SIMEX). Barings had held a seat on SIMEX for some time but did not activate it until Leeson, appointed general manager, was sent to head both front office and back office operations. Prior to leaving, Leeson was denied a broker's licence in the UK because of committing fraud on his application, having failed to report a judgment for debt against him entered by the National Westminster Bank. Neither Leeson nor Barings disclosed this denial when he applied for his licence in Singapore.

From 1992, Leeson made unauthorised speculative trades that initially made large profits for Barings: £10 million, which accounted for 10% of Barings' annual profit. He earned a bonus of £130,000 on his salary of £50,000 for that year. Leeson used one of Barings' error accounts (accounts used to correct mistakes made in trading) to hide his losses. He later stated that this account was first used to hide an error made by a subordinate who had been assigned to buy twenty futures contracts for Fuji Bank but sold them instead, costing Barings £20,000.

Leeson used this error account to cover further bad trades by himself and others. For example, he used it to cover mistakes made by one of his traders who frequently came to work after long nights of partying. Leeson believes that he first crossed into out-and-out criminal conduct when he forgot to reconcile a discrepancy of 500 contracts, costing Barings US$1.7 million. He concluded that the only way to hide such a massive error and keep his job was to hide it in the error account.

=== Downfall and imprisonment ===
By the end of 1992, the error account's losses exceeded £2 million, increasing to £23 million in late 1993. This amount then ballooned to £208 million by the end of 1994. Leeson had followed a "doubling" strategy: every time he lost money, he would bet double the amount that was lost to recoup the amount. This had been successful for him in the past, including once in 1993 where he was able to cover a £6 million negative balance in the error account and after which he vowed not to use the account again. Leeson had to maintain his reputation as a trading genius and soon found himself hiding his losses there again. As the losses grew higher, Leeson fabricated cover stories to explain why he needed more cash from London; his sterling reputation protected him from close scrutiny.

The beginning of the end occurred on 16 January 1995, when Leeson placed a short straddle in the Singapore and Tokyo stock exchanges, essentially betting that the Japanese stock market would not move significantly overnight. The Great Hanshin earthquake hit early in the morning on 17 January, sending Asian markets, and Leeson's trading positions, downward. Leeson attempted to recoup his losses by making a series of increasingly risky new trades (using a long-long future arbitrage), this time betting that the Nikkei Stock Average would make a rapid recovery. The recovery failed to materialise.

Leeson left a note reading, "I'm sorry" and fled Singapore on 23 February. Losses eventually reached £827 million (US$1.4 billion), twice Barings' available trading capital. After a failed bailout attempt, Barings, which had been the UK's oldest merchant bank, was declared insolvent on 26 February. After fleeing to Malaysia, Thailand and finally Germany, Leeson was arrested in Frankfurt and extradited to Singapore on 20 November 1995.

Leeson pleaded guilty to two counts of "deceiving the bank's auditors and of cheating the Singapore exchange", including forging documents. District judge Richard Magnus convicted Leeson and sentenced him to six and a half years in Changi Prison in Singapore. Leeson was released in July 1999 for good behaviour, and having been diagnosed with colon cancer, which he survived despite grim forecasts, after serving at least two-thirds of his sentence (four years and four months). In 1996, Leeson published an autobiography, Rogue Trader, detailing his acts. A review in the financial columns of The New York Times stated: "This is a dreary book, written by a young man very taken with himself, but it ought to be read by banking managers and auditors everywhere." In 1999, the book was made into a film of the same name starring Ewan McGregor and Anna Friel. The events also form the subject matter of a 1996 television documentary made by Adam Curtis, titled Inside Story Special: £830,000,000 – Nick Leeson and the Fall of the House of Barings.

== Post-release career ==
In 2003, as a mature student, Leeson completed a BSc in psychology at Middlesex University. He is a guest on the after-dinner and keynote speaking circuits, stating in 2019 that "two events a month is enough to keep me in the manner to which I'm accustomed". Leeson still deals in stock markets, but only with his own money.

=== Galway United ===
Leeson was appointed commercial manager of Galway United in April 2005, rising to the position of general manager in November 2005. By July 2007, he had become the club's CEO. In February 2011, after the club encountered financial problems, he resigned his position.

=== Investigator of financial misconduct ===
In March 2023, Leeson joined Red Mist Market Enforcement Unit, a corporate intelligence firm run by former Black Cube operative Seth Freedman, and turned into an investigator of financial misconduct cases.

=== Media appearances ===
In June 2005, Leeson released a new book, Back from the Brink: Coping with Stress. It picks up his story where Rogue Trader left off, including in-depth conversations with psychologist Ivan Tyrrell. In 2013, he appeared in Celebrity Apprentice Ireland on TV3.

In July 2015, Singapore's national daily newspaper, The Straits Times, published an e-book titled Guilty as Charged: 25 Crimes That Have Shaken Singapore Since 1965, which included the Nick Leeson case (Singapore gained its independence in 1965). The book was born out of collaboration between the Singapore Police Force and the newspaper itself. The paperback edition of the book was published and first appeared on bookshelves in late June 2017. The paperback edition first entered the ST bestseller list on 8 August 2017, a month after its publication.

On 5 April 2007, The Guardian reported that KPMG, the liquidators of Barings, had sold a trading jacket thought to have been worn by Leeson while trading on SIMEX in Singapore. The jacket was offered for sale on eBay but it failed to reach its reserve price despite a highest bid of £16,100. It was subsequently sold for £21,000. In October 2007, a similar jacket used by Leeson's team, but not thought to have been worn by Leeson himself, sold at auction for £4,000.

His name is mentioned in the credits of Rogue Trader, together with Barings Bank losses of US$1,400,000,000.

== Personal life ==
Leeson married Lisa Sims, later also known as Lisa Leeson, on 21 March 1992. The couple met in Jakarta, where both were working on Barings Jakarta's office in 1990. Sims resigned from Barings Bank following her marriage to Leeson.

The couple divorced in 1997, a year after Leeson's arrest. Sims later worked as a flight attendant for Virgin Atlantic.

In 2003, four years after his release from Changi Prison, Leeson married Leona Tormay, an Irish beautician.

Since 2023, he has been a private investigator dealing with cases of financial misconduct. He lives in Galway as of 2023.

== See also ==
- Kweku Adoboli
- Chia Teck Leng
- CITIC Group
- Galway United
- Clarence Hatry
- Bill Hwang
- Toshihide Iguchi
- Jérôme Kerviel
- List of Ig Nobel Prize winners
- List of trading losses
- Speculation in financial markets
- White collar crime

== Bibliography ==
- Drummond, Helga (2007). The Dynamics of Organizational Collapse: The Case of Barings Bank. Routledge. ISBN 9780415399616. LCCN 2007028584.
- Laurent, Jacque (2015). Global Derivative Debacles: From Theory To Malpractice (Second ed.). World Scientific Publishing Company. ISBN 9789814699891.
- Leeson, Nick; Whitley, Edward (1996). Rogue Trader: How I Brought Down Barings Bank and Shook the Financial World. Little, Brown. ISBN 0-316-51856-5. LCCN 96075424. OCLC 34262021.
- Leeson, Nick; Tyrrell, Ivan (2005). Back from the Brink: Coping with Stress. Virgin. ISBN 0-7535-1075-8.
- Maeda, Martha (2010). The Complete Guide to Spotting Accounting Fraud & Cover-ups. Atlantic Publishing Company. ISBN 978-1-60138-212-2. LCCN 2009050823. Archived from the original on 11 August 2023.
- Marthinsen, John E. (2018). "Barings Bank PLC: Leeson's Lessons". Risk Takers. De Gruyter. ISBN 9781547400058.
- Rawnsley, Judith H (1996). Total Risk: Nick Leeson and the Fall of Barings Bank. University of Michigan: HarperCollins. ISBN 9780887307812.
- Scott, Hal S. (2007). "14E: A Case Study in the Regulation of Futures and Options Markets: The Barings Case". International Finance: Transactions, Policy, and Regulation (14th ed.). Foundation Press. pp. 622–636. ISBN 978-1-59941-263-4. OCLC 162159692.
