= St. Gallen Symposium =

Annual Swiss conference

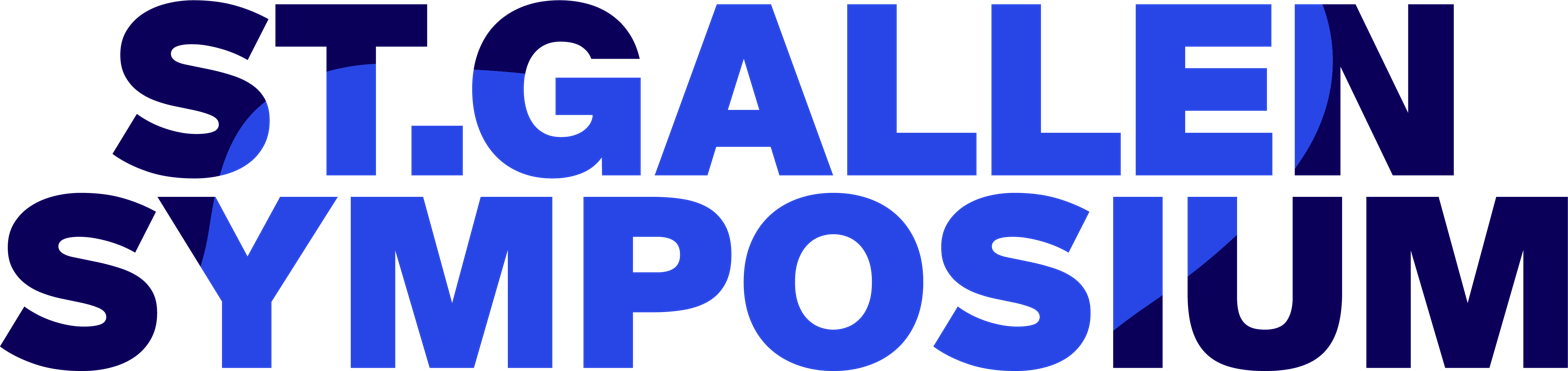
- Formation: February 1970; 56 years ago
- Founder: Wolfgang Schürer, Clemens Ernst Brenninkmeijer, Franz Karl Kriegler, Urs Schneider, Terje Wolner-Hanssen
- Type: Non-profit organisation
- Legal status: Club
- Headquarters: Dufourstrasse 83, St. Gallen, Switzerland
- Location: St. Gallen, Switzerland
- Origins: Student unrests of 1968
- Region served: Worldwide
- Members: around 30 students (ISC)
- Staff: 9
- Volunteers: approximately 450
- Website: www.symposium.org

The St. Gallen Symposium, formerly known as the International Management Symposium and the International Students’ Committee (ISC) Symposium, is an annual conference held each May at the University of St. Gallen in St. Gallen, Switzerland. It brings together leaders from business, politics, and academia to discuss economic, political, social, and related global issues.

The ISC Symposium was founded in 1970 by a group of students led by Wolfgang Schürer, Clemens Ernst Brenninkmejer, Franz Karl Kriegler, Urs Schneider, and Terje I. Wölner-Hanssen, in response to the international student protests of 1968. The first event conducted by the organisation, the International Management Dialogue, was held in 1970. The event attracted 100 students and 100 business leaders. Over time, the event received international speakers such as Kofi Annan, Satya Nadella, Josef Ackermann, and Christine Lagarde.

== Activities ==
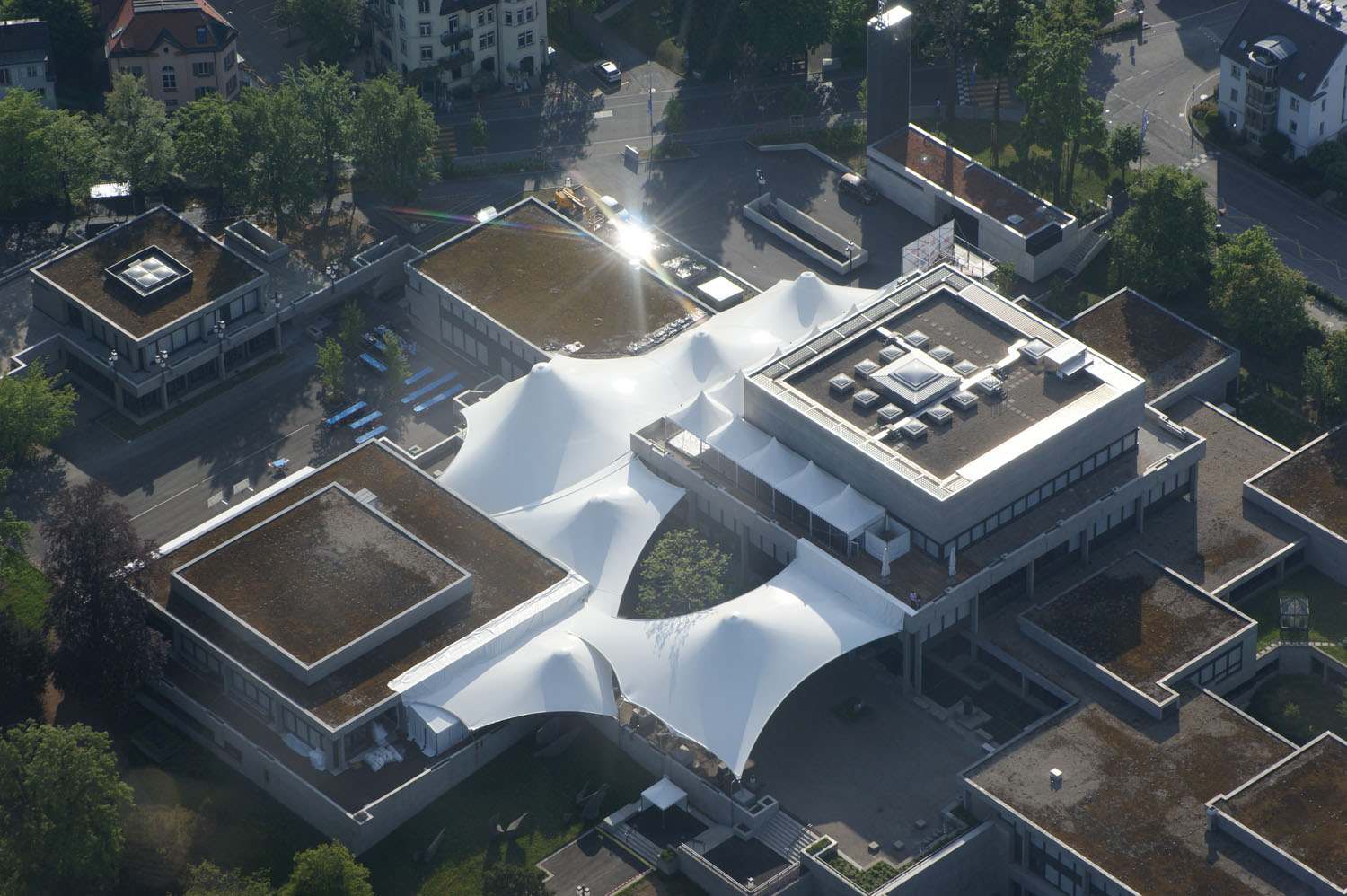
Aerial view of the campus of the University of St. Gallen during the 41st St. Gallen Symposium

The St. Gallen Symposium debates current economic, political, and social developments. This event presents as an inter-generational dialogue in a conducive and informal setting.

The symposium's topic is chosen each year based on current events and issues. Topics vary from business-oriented to more holistic themes as embodied by the topics Growth – The Good, the Bad, and the Ugly (2016), The Dilemma of Disruption (2017), Beyond the End of Work (2018), Freedom Revisited (2020), and Shifting Global Power (2025).

== History ==
The ISC organises the St. Gallen Symposium with the organising team alternating every year. In February 1970, Wolfgang Schürer (DE) founded the International Students' Committee (ISC) together with fellow academics from the University of St. Gallen, Clemens Ernst Brenninkmeyer (NL), Franz Karl Kriegler (AT), Urs Schneider (CH), and Terje I. Wölner-Hanssen (NO). They founded the ISC to replace the 1968 International Student Riots. The name, International Students' Committee, was chosen based on the different nationalities of the founders, namely Austria, Germany, the Netherlands, Norway, and Switzerland. On 30 June and 1 July 1970, the first International Management Dialogue (from the original German: Internationales Management Gespräch) occurred at the University of St. Gallen, with 100 students and many business leaders participating.

=== Early years ===
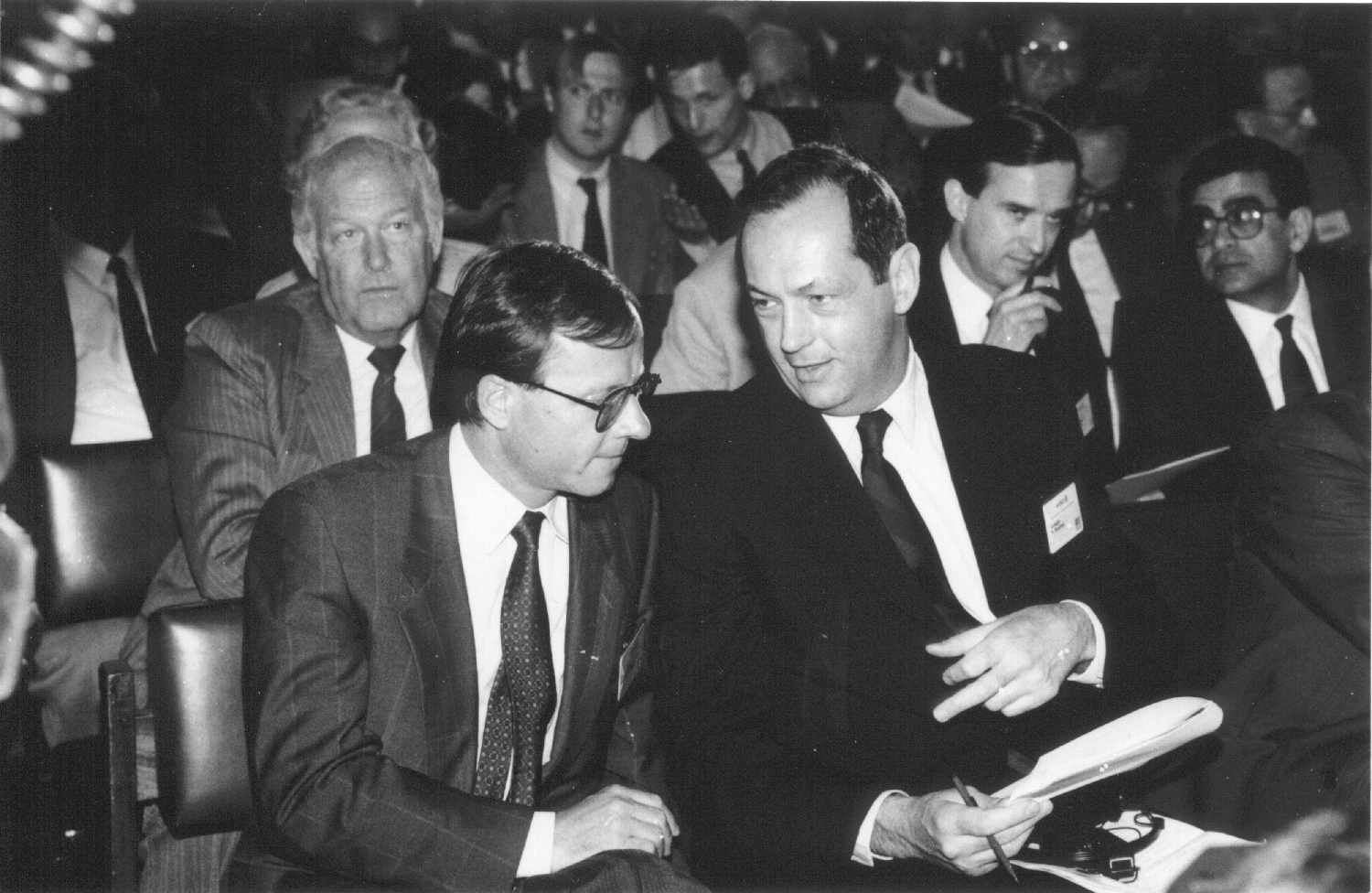
Discussion at a plenary session in the assembly hall of the University of St. Gallen during the St. Gallen Symposium

After holding the first International Management Dialogue, the founding presidents Wolfgang Schürer and Urs Schneider published a book with the presentations of the first meeting. After the first ISC event, Wolfgang Schürer institutionalised the ISC idea with the help of Urs Schneider. Around 200 people participated in the first event, with about half of them coming from prominent positions in the economies of 20 countries. The other half of the participants came from 40 different universities across Europe. After the second International Management Dialogue in the following year, the symposium was recognized by the Rectorate of the University of St. Gallen.

The Club of Rome that studies The Limits to Growth, analysing the effect of exponential growth on a finite planet, was presented at the third symposium in 1972. Aurelio Peccei and the Minister of Science of Lower Saxony, Professor Eduard Pestel, participated in that event. It was the first great forum in the German-speaking world at that time. The next symposium was not held in 1974, in theory, due to the global economic downturn caused by the 1973 Oil Crisis, and problems with the continuity of the student initiative. After that, the St. Gallen Foundation for International Studies emerged to continue the work of the International Students' Committee. The members supported the ISC over several years. In 1977, the St. Gallen Symposium made the headlines with a round table discussion with German Employers' President Hanns Martin Schleyer and DGB Chairman Heinz Oskar Vetter. The St. Gallen Foundation for International Studies developed the St. Gallen Symposia in the coming decades.

=== The 1980s ===
A change was introduced in 1989 when the International Students' Committee founded the St. Gallen Wings of Excellence Award, which today has grown in size and is now called the Global Essay Competition. The students were required to submit an essay. Only the 100 best students could participate in the St. Gallen Symposium. Moreover, authors of the best contributions were bestowed with the St. Gallen Wings of Excellence Award, CHF 20,000.– in prize money, and the chance to present their essays at the St. Gallen Symposium (see below).

=== 1995-2010 ===
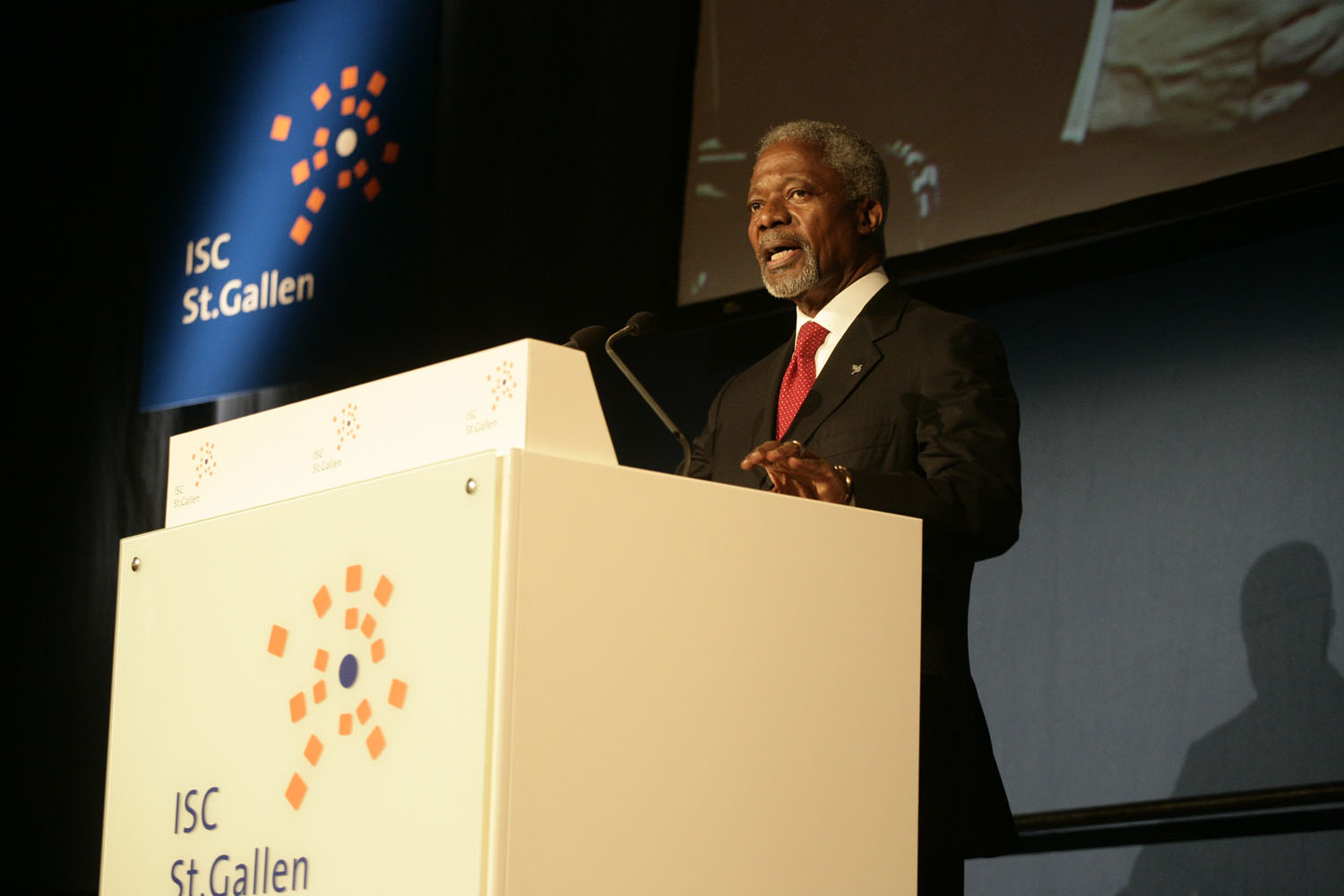
Kofi Annan at the bestowal of the Freedom-Prize of the Max Schmidheiny Foundation

Since the mid-1990's, the ISC has tried to raise the international profile of the symposium. In this restructuring, a new logo was introduced and the name "International Management Symposium" was changed to ISC-Symposium. Moreover, the ISC gave financial support for the construction of the Executive Campus HSG at the University of St. Gallen during this period.

In 2002, the Swiss Federal Council commissioned the ISC to organise the International Conference on Federalism and maintain the structure of the symposium. The conference was attended by eight heads of state and government, sixteen ministers, three federal councillors, twenty government councillors, and their delegations.

The current name, St. Gallen Symposium, was introduced in 2005. The following year, Kofi Annan, Secretary-General of the United Nations, received the Freedom Prize of the Max Schmidheiny Foundation, already awarded in 2003.

From 2008 to 2010, due to an extensive reconstruction of the University's main building and its auditorium, the symposium took place in a temporary tent city behind the Library building of the University of St. Gallen.

=== 2010-2018 ===
The 40th St. Gallen Symposium in 2010 introduced a few changes. For example, the duration of the event ranged from half a day to two days. The Topic Leaders supplemented the group of speakers, organising single events. The Knowledge Pool extended the selection of students. The Knowledge Pool consists of 100 people specifically invited to the symposium by the ISC, providing a counterweight to the 100 winners of the academic St. Gallen Wings of Excellence Award (now the Global Essay Competition).[1] Another innovation was the Global Perspectives Barometer (now the Voices Report), an annual survey of current and former student participants on current social issues in cooperation with the GfK Association (Credit Suisse until 2013).

The St. Gallen Symposium got a new office in Singapore at the beginning of 2012.

The restructuring of the St. Gallen Symposium began in 2017 and was planned to be completed by 2020. During this period, a new group called Aspiring Leaders was introduced, the organisation of worldwide Year-Round Events was intensified, and the symposium's overall offerings were adjusted.

The Aspiring Leaders are a group of young decision-makers who have reached the early milestones of their careers, intended to bridge the gap between the Leaders of Tomorrow and the Senior Leaders. The Year-Round Events—around ten held annually in Europe and Asia—support the St. Gallen Symposium's goal of fostering inter-generational dialogue throughout the year. These include the Singapore Reception in November and the Zurich Reception in January.

Since 2019

In September 2019, the St. Gallen Symposium adopted a new logo to emphasise the progressiveness and student character of the initiative. The new branding was further underlined by the motto "Where aspirations get inspired." At the 49th St. Gallen Symposium, a workshop session format, "Interactive Session," was introduced. The "Interactive Sessions" take place in parallel with the "Insight Sessions".

Postponement of the 50th Anniversary Symposium

Due to the outbreak of COVID-19, the 50th St. Gallen Symposium, scheduled for 10 March 2020, was officially postponed to 2021. It was the second time the St. Gallen Symposium could not be held at its planned time.

New formats

For the St. Gallen Symposium from 5 May to 7 May 2021, strategic further development of the physical dialogue with digital elements was realized, thus guaranteeing the security of the participants and more sustainability. Newly, the St. Gallen Symposium also took place through two hubs in New York and Singapore and worked with 8 Swiss embassies all over the world on new formats.

Managers, politicians, and scientists were invited to the 50th edition of the symposium in May 2021 (under the motto Trust Matters) to broaden the discussion. German climate activist Luisa Neubauer, the overall ski World Cup winner Aleksander Aamodt Kilde, and the German Jesuit Klaus Mertes, who helped to uncover the abuse scandals in the Catholic Church, took part in the symposium. The committee selected approximately 200 young talents ("Leaders of Tomorrow"). 40% of the invited speakers were women. It was a higher percentage than any previous symposium.

== Programme and sessions ==
The St. Gallen Symposium happens for two days at the beginning of May. The official program includes different types of sessions:

- Plenary Sessions introduce the main topics and raise controversial issues, a starting point for the following Insight Sessions. The Plenary Sessions are divided into One-on-One, where two people meet on stage. The Keynote Panel, a traditional panel discussion, and the Keynote Address are platforms where a speaker delivers a speech.
- The roughly 30 Insight Sessions are held in smaller groups of about 25–35 attendees and serve as a follow-up to the Plenary Sessions. A characteristic of Insight Sessions is the personal framework. A speaker initiates the discussion, whereas the grand part of an Insight Session consists of a vibrant discussion moderated by a Topic Leader. To achieve a lively argument, the Chatham House Rule is applied.
- Interactive Sessions take place simultaneously with the Insight Sessions. Unlike Insight Sessions, the Interactive Sessions focus on landing the Topic itself rather than the Topic Leader and Speaker. In this environment, participants can elaborate on possible solutions in an interactive and intimate environment. The Insight Sessions appear in a small setting with 20 participants at most.
- Social Sessions enable the participants to continue engaging in informal dialogues beyond the official program, like Dinner Nights or lunches.
- Furthermore, Public Insight Sessions aim to introduce the participants to complex issues and theories. Those sessions often only deal distantly with the topic of the St. Gallen Symposium. Public Insight Sessions are open to anyone interested in the St. Gallen Symposium and its initiative.

Apart from Public Insight Sessions, the sessions are not open to the public. However, selected Plenary Sessions are live and broadcast on the St. Gallen Symposium's official YouTube channel. Furthermore, with the support of the Ria & Arthur Dietschweiler Foundation, key findings of the annual symposium are presented and discussed at the St. Gallen Symposium in Town Sessions.

== Participants ==
The St. Gallen Symposium has three participant groups: the "Senior Leaders" (former Leaders of Today), the "Leaders of Tomorrow", and the "Aspiring Leaders".

The "Senior Leaders" consist of 600 people from economic, political, social, and academic fields. They can be classified into the group's partners, participants, guests, speakers, and topic leaders, who moderate the discussions.

The "Leaders of Tomorrow" are 200 participants below 30 years old. Their qualifications must be according to the criteria for the "Global Essay Competition" (former St. Gallen Wings of Excellence Award) or the Knowledge Pool. The latter group of selected participants must respect the criteria, such as topic relevance and past performance. The St. Gallen Symposium provides Leaders of Tomorrow with a platform where they can discuss with today's executives at eye level and challenge them so that new approaches to thinking and solutions can emerge.

The "Aspiring Leaders" are participants who have the potential to take on a leading role in an industry.

Nr.	Topic	Speakers (selection)
35	Liberty, Trust and Responsibility	Sheila Dikshit, Franz Fehrenbach, Gerd Leipold, Bernd Pischetsrieder, Jaap de Hoop Scheffer, Peter Wuffli
36	Inspiring Europe	Danuta Hübner, John Kornblum, Jan Kulczyk, Sergio Marchionne, Ulf Schneider, Peter Voser, Werner Wenning
37	The Power of Natural Resources	Gary Becker, Nikolaus von Bomhard, Fujio Chō, Mohammad Chātami, Julius Meinl, Naguib Sawiris, Jeroen van der Veer
38	Global Capitalism – Local Values	Heinz Fischer, Christoph Franz, Jeannot Krecké, Christine Lagarde, Michel Pébereau, Dieter Zetsche
39	Revival of Political and Economic Boundaries	Paul Achleitner, Robert Aumann, Brady W. Dougan, Mathias Döpfner, John Elkann, Toomas Hendrik Ilves, Tharman Shanmugaratnam, Boris Tadić
40	Entrepreneurs – Agents of Change	Josef Ackermann, Paul Bulcke, Niall Ferguson, Anthony Giddens, Jürgen Hambrecht, Morten Lund, Samih Sawiris
41	Just Power	Ribal al-Assad, Bob Dudley, Johan Galtung, Oswald Grübel, Yoshimasa Hayashi, Ayaan Hirsi Ali, Eberhard von Koerber, Jorma Ollila
42	Facing Risk	Yukiya Amano, Ulrich Beck, Sepp Blatter, Walter Kielholz, Kumi Naidoo, Giorgos Andrea Papandreou, Severin Schwan, Jean-Claude Trichet
43	Rewarding Courage	Ali Babacan, Sergio P. Ermotti, Laurence D. Fink, Douglas Flint, Christine Lagarde, Mohamoud Ahmed Nur, Marcus Wallenberg
44	The Clash of Generations	Didier Burkhalter, Aubrey de Grey, Niall Ferguson, Ivan Glasenberg, Lazar Krstić, Raghuram Rajan, Tony Tan Keng Yam, Robert Zoellick
45	Proudly Small	Daron Acemoğlu, Thomas Jordan, Ulrich Grillo, Sigmundur Davíð Gunnlaugsson, Paul Kagame, Paul Polman, Anders Fogh Rasmussen, Tharman Shanmugaratnam
46	Growth – the good, the bad, and the ugly	Xavier Bettel, Peter Brabeck-Letmathe, Baron David de Rothschild, Christoph Franz, Dambisa Moyo, Tidjane Thiam, Chan Chun Sing, Marcela Escobari, Nils Smedegaard Andersen
47	The dilemma of disruption	Charles O'Holliday, Anders Samuelsen, Martin Blessing, Santiago Calatrava, J. Erik Fyrwald, Kersti Kaljulald, Neil Harbisson, Sir John Scarlett
48	Beyond the end of work	Dominic Barton, Denis McDonough, Marcus Wallenberg, Alain Dehaze, Sigmar Gabriel, Bogolo Kenewendo, Jeremy Rifkin, Steve Forbes, The Right Honourable Adrienne Clarkson, Lawrence Wong
49	Capital for Purpose	Niall Ferguson, Linda Hill, Dominic Barton, Fabien Curto Millet, Dirk Hoke, Thomas Jordan, Simona Scarpaleggia, Mariana Mazzucato, Peter Wuffli, Lindsey Aldaco-Manner, Bobby Jones, Ankit Anand, Simon Evenett
50	Trust Matters	Satya Nadella, Antoinette Weibel, Christoph Franz, Christoph Heusgen, John L. Hennessy, Karin Keller-Sutter, Klaus Mertes, Klaus Wellershoff, Lilly Blaudszun, Mamphela Ramphele, Marianne Janik, Ulf Schneider, Ola Källenius, Peter Maurer, Peter Voser, Richard David Precht, Simone Menne, Thomas Gottstein
51	Collaborative Advantage	Justin Trudeau, Karoline Edstadler, Ben van Beurden, Ignazio Cassis, Maria Ressa, Friedrich Merz, Claudia Plakolm
52	A New Generational Contract	Nicolai Tangen, Oleksandra Matchivuuk, Guy Parmelin, Ricarda Lang, Desmond Lee, Ayo Tometi, Sal Khan, Mamphela Ramphele, Thomas Jordan, Eckart von Hirschhausen, Esther Wojcicki, Leonhard Birnbaum, René Obermann, Peter Voser, Peter Wuffli, Johannes Teyssen, Vanessa Nakate
53	Confronting Scarcity	Karin Keller Sutter, Jakov Mijatovic, Egils Levits, Carsten Spor, Vanessa Nakate, Christian Kohlpaintner, Julija Nawalnaja, Wladimir Klitschko
54	Shifting Global Powers	Wladimir Klitschko, Jakov Miljatovic, Leon Schreiber, Magnus Brunner, Karin Keller-Sutter, Thomas Buberl, Thomas Schinecker, Roland Busch, Christian Sewing, Christoph Heusgen, Andreas Berger, Thomas Süssli, Kai Diekmann, Peter Voser

== Prize ceremony ==
Every year, the Winners of the Global Essay Competition (before the St. Gallen Wings of Excellence Award) receive an award during the St. Gallen Symposium. The Global Essay Competition is an essay competition for students from all over the world.[1] In addition, from 1979 to 2003, the St. Gallen Symposium was the platform for the bestowal of the Max Schmidheiny Foundation's Freedom Prize.

=== The Global Essay Competition ===
The Global Essay Competition (former St. Gallen Wings of Excellence Award) is an essay competition for students at the graduate or postgraduate level. The authors of the 100 best submissions can travel to St. Gallen for one week and participate in the St. Gallen Symposium. Since the essay's topic is always related to the symposium's main topic of discussion, the five best authors can present their essays in front of a global audience during the Conference. It has CHF 20'000. With more than 1000 contributions from over 60 different countries annually, the St. Gallen Wings of Excellence Award is one of the biggest student essay competitions of its kind. The evaluation process is anonymous and carried out by a preliminary and main jury. The first has PhD students from the University of St. Gallen and the ETH Zurich, whereas the main jury comprises professors, corporate executives, entrepreneurs, and politicians. The current president of the preliminary jury is Heike Bruch, and the main jury is Georg F. von Krogh. Other members are Peter Day, Nigel Fretwell, Heike Bruch, Marcela Escobar, and Riz Khan.

The Global Essay Competition was first launched in 1989 to select student participants for the symposium and was modified several times. An adjustment was made restricting the eligibility to graduate and postgraduate students in 2009, and a simultaneous reduction of the invitations based on the essay competition from 200 to 100 invitations. The other 100 students have since then been recruited by the ISC through the so-called Knowledge Pool.

=== Freedom-Prize of the Max Schmidheiny Foundation ===
From 1979 until 2003, the Max Schmidheiny Foundation annually awarded its Freedom Prize during the symposium. The prestigious honourees include Kofi Annan, Nicolas Hayek, the International Committee of the Red Cross, Jorma Ollila, and Muhammad Yunus. In 2003, the Max Schmidheiny Foundation decided to focus on other activities and abandoned the Freedom Prize.

== Organisation ==
=== International Students' Committee (ISC) ===
The St. Gallen Symposium, since its establishment in 1969, has been organized by the International Students' Committee, an independent non-profit organization and an accredited association of the University of St. Gallen. Every year, it consists of a team of about 30 students from the University of St. Gallen who pause their studies for one year. This team includes three (in former years, two) members of the previous ISC Team who form the Head of the Organising Committee. During the symposium, the ISC has a crew of about 450 volunteers, all students from the University of St. Gallen.

Numerous old ISC members are now occupying leading positions. Some of the most well-known ISC alumni are:

- Martin Blessing (former CEO, Commerzbank)
- Walter Kielholz (former Chairman, Swiss Re)
- Dr. Stephan Leithner (CEO, Deutsche Börse AG)
- Dr. Christoph Loos (Chairman of the Board, Hilti AG)
- Dr. Mathias Imbach (Co-Founder & Chief Executive Officer, Sygnum Bank)
- Tim Pietsch (Chief Financial Officer, Wefox)
- Konrad Hummler (Chairman, Private Client Bank)
- Claudius Senst (Member of the Executive Board Axel-Springer SE)
- Clara Streit (Chairwoman Deutsche Börse AG & Vonovia)
- Philipp Navratil (CEO, Nestlé)

=== St. Gallen Foundation for International Studies (SSIS) ===
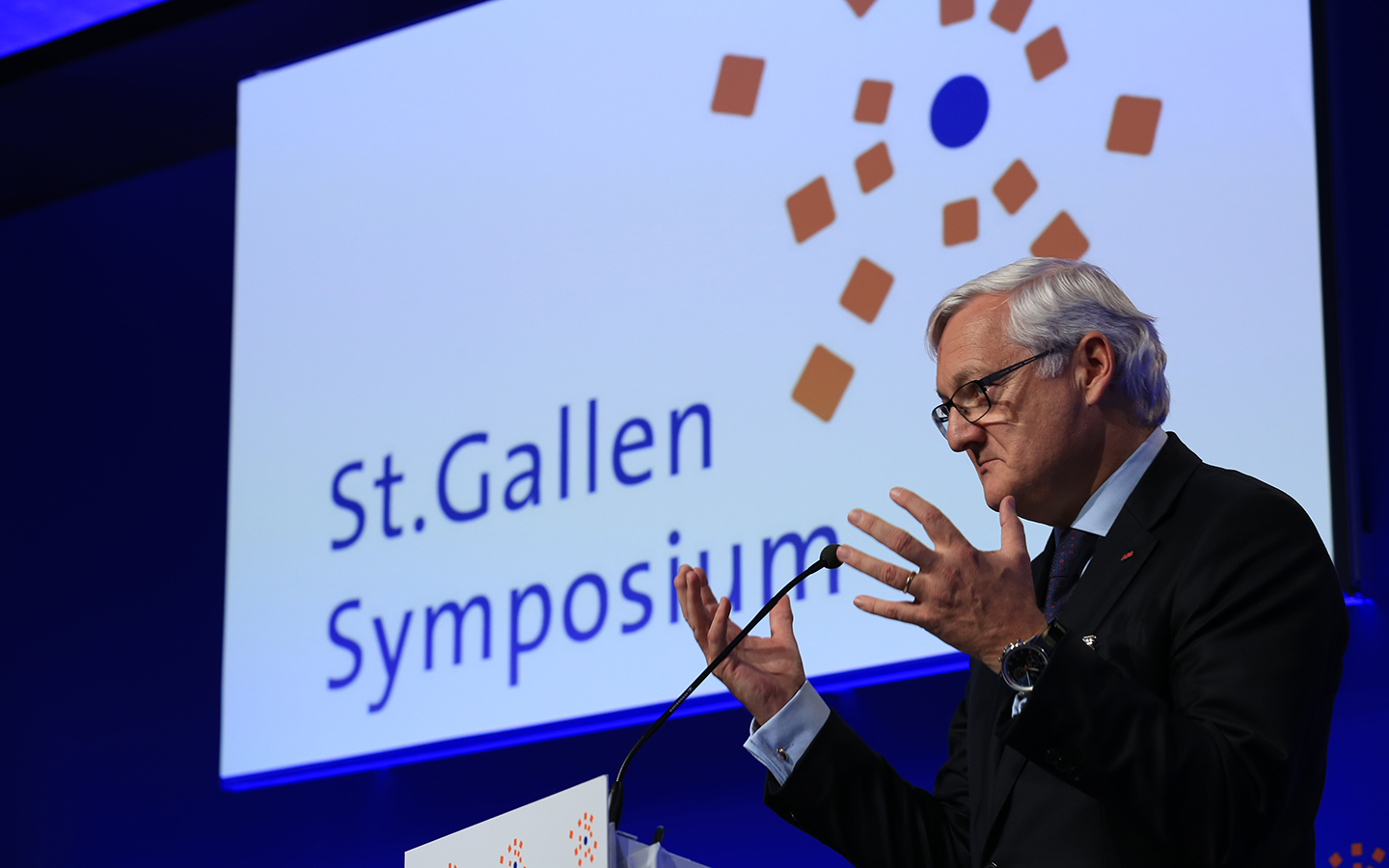
Peter Voser, President of the St. Gallen Foundation for International Studies, at the 45th St. Gallen Symposium

The St. Gallen Foundation for International Studies acts as the supervisory body and ensures the continuity of the symposium, given the annually changing organizing team. The foundation has about ten members, with Beat Ulrich being the current CEO. Former CEOs include Philip Erzinger (2008-2017), Andreas Kirchschläger (1997-2008), Eugen von Keller (1995-1997), Gerard & Ursula Stoudman and Wolfgang Schürer (1975-1993).

The Board of Trustees supervises the St. Gallen Foundation for International Studies with Peter Voser (Chairman ABB) as its Chairman. Further members are Manuel Ammann (President University of St. Gallen), Andreas Berger (CEO Swiss Re), Sabrina Soussan (Chairwoman Continental, former CEO Suez), Claudia Suessmuth Dyckerhoff (Board Member Clariant), Philipp Navratil (ISC Alumni, CEO Nestlé), Steven Althaus (ISC Alumni, CEO Grenzebach Group), Clara Streit (ISC Alumni, Chairwoman Deutsche Börse Group & Vonovia) and Ulrike Landfester (Professor University of St. Gallen). Josef Ackermann (former CEO Deutsche Bank) is the honorary chairman and a former member of the board.

Conference Chairpersons are Lord Griffiths of Fforestfach, Dominik Barton, Roshni Nadar, and Christoph Heusgen.

=== Funding ===
The 1974-established Circle of Benefactors constitutes the key element in the non-profit organization's funding. Currently, it encompasses more than 400 companies, which commit themselves for three years at a time to support the St. Gallen Symposium with a financial contribution. The Establishment of this long-term relationship continues, and the eventual cancellation of the event, like in 1979, can be prevented. The participants were invited to the Dinner for the Circle of Benefactors on Wednesday of the symposium, despite the St. Gallen Symposium's participation.

This Circle of Benefactors has eight main partners, providing special support in their respective areas: ABB, Accenture, BCG, UBS, Kia, Swiss Re, Omega, and the Max Schmidheiny Foundation.

The St. Gallen Symposium has partnered with the Max Schmidheiny Institution and the University of St. Gallen, making the symposium's infrastructure available every year. With the support of the St. Gallen-based Ria & Arthur Dietschweiler Foundation, the St. Gallen Symposium Public Forum is enabled.

Moreover, there are numerous donors who contribute to the funding.
