= Christian Mumenthaler =

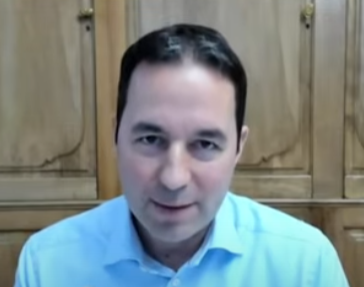
- Speaking at the 2021 World Economic Forum
- Born: 21 June 1969 (age 57)
- Education: PhD in Physics (ETH Zurich)
- Occupation: Business executive
- Title: Former Group Chief Executive Officer, Swiss Re

Christian Mumenthaler (born 21 June 1969) is a Swiss citizen and former Group Chief Executive Officer of Swiss Re, a position he held from 1 July 2016 until 30 June 2024. Since 2025, he has served as chairman of the board of trustees of the UBS Center for Economics in Society at the University of Zurich.

== Education ==
Mumenthaler holds a PhD from the Institute of Molecular Biology and Biophysics at the Swiss Federal Institute of Technology in Zürich.

== Career ==
Christian Mumenthaler started his career in 1997 as an associate with the Boston Consulting Group.

He joined Swiss Re in 1999 and was responsible for key company projects. In 2002, he established and headed the Group Retro and Syndication unit. Mumenthaler served as Group Chief Risk Officer between 2005 and 2007 and was Head of Life & Health between 2007 and 2010. In January 2011, he was appointed Chief Marketing Officer Reinsurance and a member of the Group Executive Committee and became Chief Executive Officer Reinsurance in October 2011.

In July 2016, Christian Mumenthaler was appointed Group Chief Executive Officer. On 1 January 2023, he additionally assumed the role of Chairman of the Swiss Re Strategic Council. He was Group Chief Executive Officer until July 2024. Since 2025, he has served as chairman of the board of trustees of the UBS Center for Economics in Society at the University of Zurich. The World Economic Forum appointed Christian Mumenthaler as a Young Global Leader from 2005-2010.

Prior to his career in business, he created the 1994 Amiga computer game Colonial Conquest II, and made covers for albums by industrial music acts such as Front Line Assembly and X Marks the Pedwalk.

In 2023, Mumenthaler was named on the Time 100 Climate list.

== Other affiliations ==
Mumenthaler had a number of mandates including

- Chairman of the Geneva Association
- Co-Chair of WEF Alliance of CEO Climate Leaders
- Board member of economiesuisse
- Member of the Pan-European Insurance Forum; the Global Reinsurance Forum; the Steering Committee of the Insurance Development Forum; Insurance Europe’s Reinsurance Advisory Board; the Board of Trustees of the St. Gallen Foundation for International Studies and Avenir Suisse

== Publications ==
- Self-correcting distance geometry for the automatic assignment of NMR NOESY spectra and the prediction of protein tertiary structures. Zürich 1996. Dissertation ETH Zürich, No. 11995, 1996, doi:10.3929/ethz-a-001761326.
