= Walter Kielholz =

Former chairman of the supervisory board and former CEO of Swiss Re

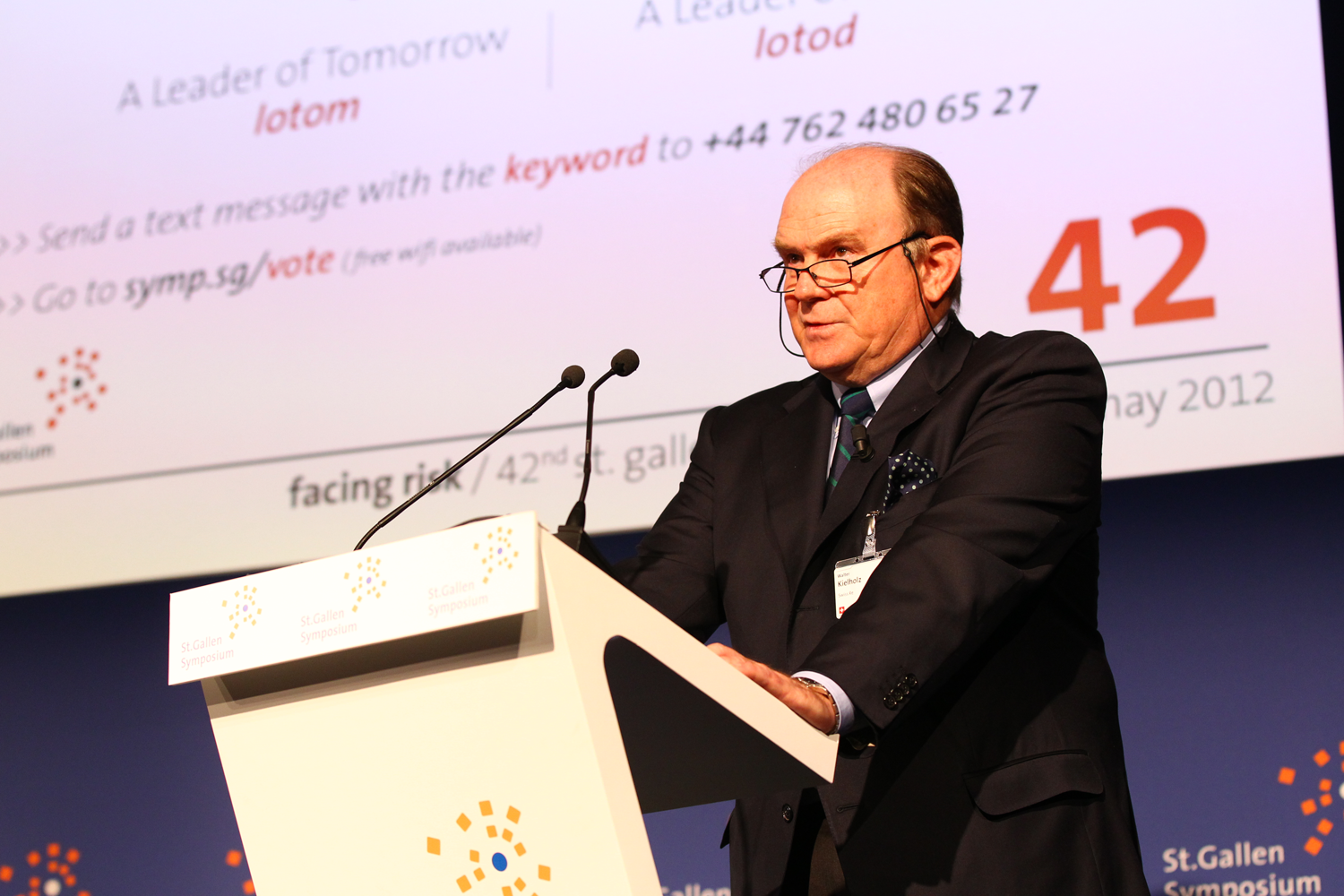
- Walter B. Kielholz
- Born: Walter Bruno Kielholz; 25 February 1951 (age 74); Zürich, Switzerland
- Education: University of St. Gallen (1976)
- Occupations: Chairman of the supervisory board and former CEO of Swiss Re
- Spouse: Daphne Kielholz-Pestalozzi

Walter Bruno Kielholz (born 25 February 1951) was chairman of the board of directors and former CEO of Swiss Re.

Kielholz completed a degree in business administration at the University of St. Gallen, Switzerland, in 1976. From 1997 to 2002 he was CEO of Swiss Re. He was Swiss Re's Chairman from 2009 to 2021. He has been Honorary Chairman of Swiss Re since April 2021.

== Biography ==
Kielholz studied business administration at the University of St. Gallen, and graduated in 1976 with a degree in business finance and accounting.

He began his career at the General Reinsurance Corporation, Zurich in 1976. After working in the US, UK and Italy, he assumed responsibility for the company's European marketing. In 1983 he opened an art gallery and picture framing business with his wife, Daphne Kielholz-Pestalozzi. A second gallery was opened in 1986. He joined Credit Suisse in 1986, where he was responsible for client relations with large insurance groups in the multinational services department.

In 1989, Kielholz joined Swiss Re, Zurich. He became a member of the executive board in January 1993 and was Swiss Re's chief executive officer from 1997 to 2002, succeeding Lukas Mühlemann. During this period, Swiss Re introduced important new products such as Insurance Linked Securities, which enable risk-transfer to the capital markets. He was executive vice chairman of the board of directors from 2003 to 2006 and vice chairman from 2007 to April 2009. He was nominated chairman with effect from 1 May 2009. Before becoming their Honorary Chairman in 2021, Kielholz had been the Swiss Re Chairman since 2009. Sergio Ermotti, former CEO of UBS, was named as his successor as chairman. His appointment was confirmed at the Annual General Meeting on 16 April 2021. Kielholz was a member of the board of directors of Credit Suisse Group AG from 1999 to May 2014. He was chairman of the bank's board of directors from 2003 to 2009. Upon reaching the statutory age of 70, Walter Kielholz retired as Swiss Re's Chairman in April 2021. In recognition of his long-standing work for Swiss Re, the Board nominated Walter Kielholz Honorary Chairman.

Until mid-2015, Kielholz also was chairman of the European Financial Services Roundtable (EFR), which contributes to the European public policy debate on issues relating to financial services. He was also a member (president in 2006/2007) of the International Monetary Conference (IMC), an association of the largest banks worldwide, and vice chairman of the board of the Institute of International Finance (IIF), the world's only global association of financial institutions. In addition, he is a founding member (in the year 2000) and former chairman of the Board of Trustees of Avenir Suisse, a think tank for economic and social issues. From 1998 to 2005, and again since 2009, he has served as a member of the International Business Leader Advisory Council (IBLAC), an advisory group to the Mayor of Shanghai composed mainly of the chairs of the board and CEOs of major global corporations. In 2009 he became a member of the International Advisory Panel (IAP) of the Monetary Authority of Singapore (MAS), which advises the MAS on the country's financial sector reforms and strategies. In 2015 he has been conferred the Public Service Star (Distinguished Friends of Singapore) award in Singapore. This national award is given during Singapore's National Day celebrations to recognize individuals for their various forms of merits and service to Singapore.

He also chaired the board of trustees of the Swiss Re Foundation, established in 2012, from the creation of the Foundation until his retirement as Swiss Re Chairman in 2021.

In 2005, Kielholz was elected by the members of the International Insurance Society to the Insurance Hall of Fame, which honours individuals who have exercised substantial influence on the industry for the benefit of society.

Kielholz is a co-founder (1970) of the International St. Gallen Symposium (ISC) at University of St. Gallen and is a member of the board of trustees of the St. Gallen Foundation.

Kielholz enjoys sailing, skiing, tennis, golf, reading, opera, concerts and art. From June 2002 to May 2021, he was chairman of the Zurich Art Society, which runs the Kunsthaus Zürich museum. Anne Keller Dubach became his successor. He has also been a strong supporter of art as an element of corporate culture as expressed through Swiss Re's Art collection which is featured in Swiss Re buildings across the world and includes over 4'000 pieces of modern art.

Kielholz has also been a driving force behind Swiss Re's strong stance on corporate architecture – as expressed by buildings such as Swiss Re's Centre for Global Dialogue, Rüschlikon/Zürich, the building at 30 St Mary Axe, London, ("the Gherkin"), or the "Swiss Re Next" building at Mythenquai in Zürich.

Kielholz is married and lives in Zurich. In 2020, the business magazine "Bilanz" estimated his assets at CHF 175 million.

A biography is available (in German only): René Luechinger: Walter Kielholz - Swiss Re und Credit Suisse, der Freisinn und die Kunst, Staempfli, 2012.

== Publications ==
- Demografie und Zukunftsfähigkeit. Politische und ökonomische Herausforderungen einer alternden Gesellschaft. NZZ Libro, Zurich 2017, ISBN 978-3-03810-248-9.

== Literature ==
- 9783727211416 Swiss Re und Credit Suisse Der Freisinn und die Kunst René Lüchinger, Stämpfli, Bern 2012 ISBN 978-3-7272-1141-6
- Walter Kielholz, in the Munzinger-Archiv
- Walter Kielholz: Kühler Stratege mit Charisma Werner Enz, Ermes Gallarotti, Neue Zürcher Zeitung, Zürich 2021
