= Colm Kelleher =

Irish business executive and banker (born 1957)

- Born: Thomas Columba Kelleher; 30 May 1957 (age 69); Bandon, County Cork, Ireland
- Education: Oriel College, Oxford (MA)
- Occupation: Business executive
- Known for: Chairman of UBS; Former president and CFO of Morgan Stanley
- Children: 3

Thomas Columba "Colm" Kelleher (born 30 May 1957) is an Irish-British business executive and banker. He has been the chairman of the board of directors of the Swiss multinational investment bank and financial services company, UBS Group, since 2022. Before joining UBS, Kelleher held various positions spanning three decades at Morgan Stanley, from 1989 to 2019.

== Early life and education ==
Thomas Columba Kelleher was born in Bandon, County Cork, Ireland, on 30 May 1957, to a doctor father and a homemaker mother. He was one of nine children raised in a deeply religious Catholic family. When he was a teen, their family relocated to Warrington in northern England; he did his schooling at St. Edward's College, a Catholic school in Liverpool. Kelleher and his brothers were altar boys.

He graduated from Oxford University's Oriel College with a Master of Arts in modern history. He is an honorary fellow of Oriel College, Oxford.

== Career ==
After graduation, Kelleher moved into banking joining the London-based bank Robert Fleming & Co. He then spent four years at the auditing firm Arthur Andersen in London. During his tenure there, he qualified as a chartered accountant. In 1985, he joined NatWest's subsidiary County Bank of London, where he met his future wife.

=== Morgan Stanley (1989–2019) ===
In 1989, Bob Diamond recruited Kelleher to join Morgan Stanley's debt markets division in London, where he worked in fixed income sales and later became head of global capital markets. He was the Chief Financial Officer of Morgan Stanley and co-head of strategy from 2007 to 2009, during the 2008 financial crisis. Kelleher is credited for significantly reducing Morgan Stanley's balance sheet, increasing its cash position, and transforming it to a conventional bank holding company so it could access funding from the US Federal Reserve. He played a key role in negotiating a $9 billion financial injection from Japanese bank Mitsubishi UFJ Financial Group.

In early 2009, Kelleher led Morgan Stanley's acquisition of Citigroup's Smith Barney brokerage unit. While the merger faced challenges initially and spanned several years to fully integrate, it ultimately proved successful and contributed to Morgan Stanley becoming a major player in wealth management. In December 2009, he was appointed as co-president of the Institutional Securities Group, along with Paul J. Taubman. He was tasked with fixing Morgan Stanley's investment bank. This helped their wealth management business, which was already doing well, grow further. He had to deal with getting rid of risky investments that were hard to sell and caused some losses. A protracted power struggle with Taubman resulted in his quitting in 2012, leaving Kelleher as the sole head. In 2015, Kelleher led a significant overhaul of Morgan Stanley's fixed income division. He ultimately became president of the entire firm in 2016, overseeing both Institutional Securities and Wealth Management. Greg Fleming, the head of wealth management at the time and seen as the CEO heir apparent to James P. Gorman, departed the firm upon Kelleher's promotion. Kelleher retired from his position in 2019, but remained as a special adviser, retaining an office, a personal assistant, and a Bloomberg Terminal.

After his retirement, one of Deutsche Bank's majority owners, Cerberus Capital Management, tried to bring in Kelleher as the bank's supervisory chairman, but did not have the support of the board. He was also approached for a similar position at Credit Suisse, but Kelleher did not consider it.

=== UBS (2022–present) ===
Kelleher joined the board of UBS as chairman in April 2022, succeeding Axel A. Weber. When the 2023 US regional banking crisis spread to Credit Suisse, he led negotiations on behalf of UBS to consummate the acquisition. Kelleher brought in the former CEO Sergio Ermotti replacing Ralph Hamers to lead the integration and restructuring efforts.

=== Other activities ===
Kelleher is a board member of Bretton Woods Committee, Bank Policy Institute, and on the advisory council of the British Museum. He was on the board of Norfolk Southern from 2019 until 2025.

He is a freeman of the City of London. He is a Fellow of the Institute of Chartered Accountants in England and Wales. Kelleher is a visiting professor of banking and finance at Loughborough's business school.

== Personal life ==
Kelleher is married and has two sons and a daughter. After retiring from Morgan Stanley, he completed the near 500-mile religious pilgrimage Camino de Santiago raising over US$330,000 for Student Sponsor Partners. He lives in Zürich and owns houses in London and Tuscany.

His brother Declan Kelleher is a former Irish ambassador to the European Union and to China.
