= Ted Pick =

American business executive (born 1968)

- Born: Edward Noel Pick; October 31, 1968 (age 58); New York City, US
- Education: Middlebury College; Harvard Business School (MBA)
- Employer: Morgan Stanley
- Title: Chairman and CEO
- Spouse: Betsey Kittenplan (m. 2000)
- Children: 2

Edward Noel Pick (born October 31, 1968) is an American banker who is the chief executive officer of Morgan Stanley since January 2024 and the company's chairman since January 2025. He previously was the bank's Co-President, Co-Head of Firm Strategy and Head of the Institutional Securities Group, overseeing Investment Banking, Equities, Fixed Income, Global Capital Markets and Research.

== Early life ==
Pick was born on October 31, 1968, in New York City. His mother was an archivist at the Thomas J. Watson Library of the Metropolitan Museum of Art, and his father owned and ran a New York-based investment firm called the Blue Channel Corporation. Pick grew up in Caracas, Venezuela, during his early childhood before moving back to the US while his father was working in the petrochemicals industry.

Pick studied Russian history and politics at Middlebury College, followed by an MBA from the Harvard Business School.

== Career ==
Pick joined Morgan Stanley as an analyst in 1990 after completing his undergraduate studies and returned to the company following his MBA. His entry was facilitated through a connection with a classmate at Middlebury related to former Morgan Stanley chair S. Parker Gilbert.

In 2002, Pick was named managing director. By 2005, he was in charge of a division, and was involved in capital-raising activities during the 2008 financial crisis. He became a member of the management committee in 2008.

From 2009 to 2015, Pick was involved in global equities trading. During that time Morgan Stanley surpassed Goldman Sachs as the leading equities business, for which the firm's president Colm Kelleher credited Pick as being instrumental. He subsequently took on the role of rejuvenating Morgan Stanley's fixed-income business. This involved reducing its workforce by 25% and addressing revenue concerns. He later held the position of global head of sales and trading. Over the years, he has held various roles, including managing director and head of equity capital markets.

From 2021 to 2023, Pick served as the co-president of Morgan Stanley. He became the company's CEO at the beginning of 2024 and chairman in January 2025.

Pick is a member of The Business Council.

== Personal life ==
In 2000, Pick married Betsey Kittenplan, with whom he has two daughters. He lives in New York's Upper East Side and has a vacation home in Martha's Vineyard. He is a Trustee at the Metropolitan Museum of Art. He enjoys math problems.

Business positions
Preceded by James P. Gorman	Chief Executive Officer of Morgan Stanley; 2024–present	Succeeded by Incumbent
Preceded by James P. Gorman	Chairman of Morgan Stanley; 2025–present	Succeeded by Incumbent
