= Martin Blessing =

German banker and businessman

- Born: July 6, 1963 (age 63); Bremen, West Germany
- Education: University of Frankfurt, University of St. Gallen, University of Chicago
- Occupation: Co-Founder of the SPAC European FinTech IPO Company (EFIC1)
- Employer: Danske Bank
- Board member of: Danske Bank (Member of the Supervisory Board), Executive Board of the Baden-Baden Entrepreneur Talks

Martin Blessing (born July 6, 1963) is a German banker and business person. Since 2025, he has been serving as Chancellor Friedrich Merz's personal envoy for increasing foreign investment in Germany.

== Early life and education ==
Blessing was born in Bremen, Germany. He is from a family of bankers. His father Werner Blessing was a board member of Deutsche Bank and his grandfather Karl Blessing was the President of the German Federal Bank.

Blessing received his high-school diploma at the Bischof-Neumann-Schule in Königstein im Taunus. After completing a banking apprenticeship at Dresdner Bank, he studied business administration at the University of Frankfurt and the University of St. Gallen (HSG) from 1984 to 1987, where he was also a member of the International Students' Committee. He continued his studies at the University of Chicago Booth School of Business and was awarded the title Master of Business Administration in 1988.

== Career ==
From 1989 to 1996, Blessing worked for McKinsey & Company where he became Partner two years prior to his leaving the company. From 1997 to 2000, he held the position of joint Head Private Clients at Dresdner Bank. From 2000 to 2001, he was Chief Executive Officer of Advance Bank, a subsidiary of Dresdner Bank AG. In July 2003 Advance Bank was dissolved as a stock corporation and legally integrated into Dresdner Bank.

=== Commerzbank, 2001–2016 ===
In November 2001, Blessing joined the Commerzbank AG, where he worked for 15 years. Before being appointed Chief Executive Officer in 2008, he held several senior management positions; from 2001 to 2004, he was Head of Private Clients, from 2004 to 2008, he was Head of Corporate Banking and from 2006 onward he was also responsible for IT & Operations.

One of his first moves as Commerzbank’s CEO – two weeks before the bankruptcy of Lehman Brothers – was to oversee Commerzbank’s takeover of Dresdner Bank, combining the-then second and third largest operators in the German banking market. He was later credited with nursing the bank back to health after it was bailed out with 18.2 billion euros by the German government in early 2009, although its share price remained under pressure. Following the bailout, Blessing’s pay was limited to 500,000 euros a year and he waived his right to bonus payments in 2012 as Commerzbank made just 6 million euros of net income that year.

In his capacity as CEO, Blessing accompanied Chancellor Angela Merkel on various state visits abroad, including to China in 2010 and 2012.

=== Later career ===
In 2016, Blessing joined UBS. He served as Co-President Global Wealth Management at UBS Group AG and member of the UBS Group Executive Board. Prior to this, he held the position of President Wealth Management from January 2018 to February 2018 and President Personal & Corporate Banking of UBS Group AG and President UBS Switzerland as well as President of the Executive Board of UBS Switzerland AG from September 2016 to December 2017. In October 2019, Blessing left UBS and was succeeded by Iqbal Khan.

On March 15, 2021, it was confirmed that Blessing, together with other top managers from the financial industry, would establish the first European special purpose acquisition company (SPAC) focused on fintechs and the financial industry.

== Other activities ==
- Germany Trade and Invest, Chair of the Supervisory Board (since 2025)
- Unzer, Member of the Advisory Board (since 2022)
- Danske Bank, Member of the Supervisory Board (since 2020), Chair of the Supervisory Board (since 2022)
- Association of German Banks, Member of the Board (2009-2012)
- Baden-Baden Entrepreneur Talks, Member of the Executive Board

== Personal life ==
During his studies he met his wife-to-be Dorothee, who as of 2026 is the global head of investment banking at J.P. Morgan & Co. The couple has three daughters. A brother-in-law of Blessing, Axel Wieandt, was CEO of Hypo Real Estate from 2008 to 2010.
