= Carsten Spohr =

German airline executive (born 1966)

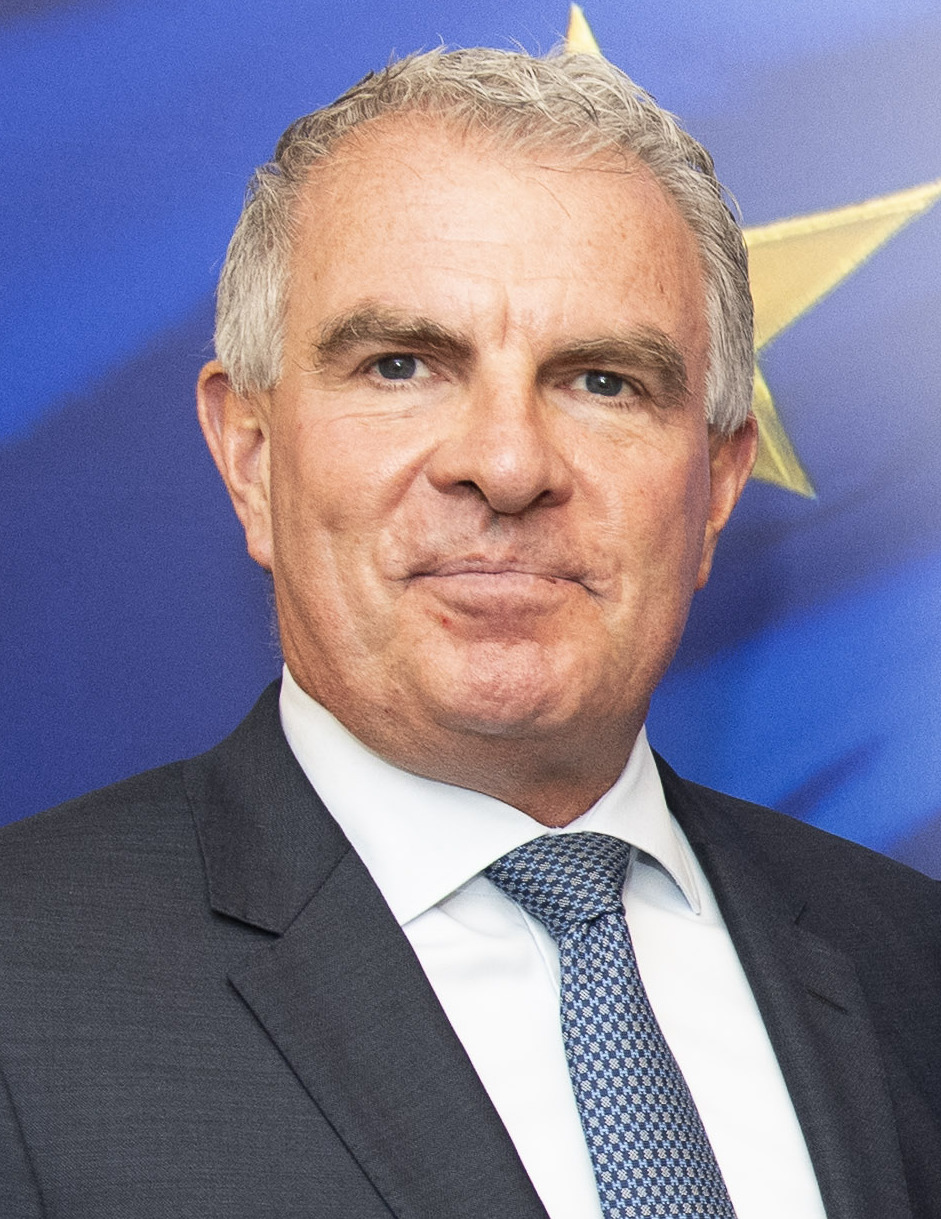
- Spohr in 2024
- Born: 16 December 1966 (age 59); Wanne-Eickel, West Germany
- Education: Karlsruhe Institute of Technology
- Occupations: Businessman, CEO and chairman
- Employer: Lufthansa Group
- Predecessor: Christoph Franz
- Partner: Vivian Alexandra Spohr
- Children: 2
- Relatives: Matthias Spohr (brother)

Carsten Spohr (born 16 December 1966) is a German airline executive. Since May 2014 he has been the chairman and chief executive officer (CEO) of Lufthansa Group.

== Education ==
After graduating with a degree in industrial engineering and management from the University of Karlsruhe (now part of the Karlsruhe Institute of Technology), Spohr obtained a commercial pilot's license at Lufthansa Flight Training in Bremen and the Airline Training Center Arizona. Spohr continues to maintain this license until the present day. His license allows him to fly the Airbus A320.

== Career ==
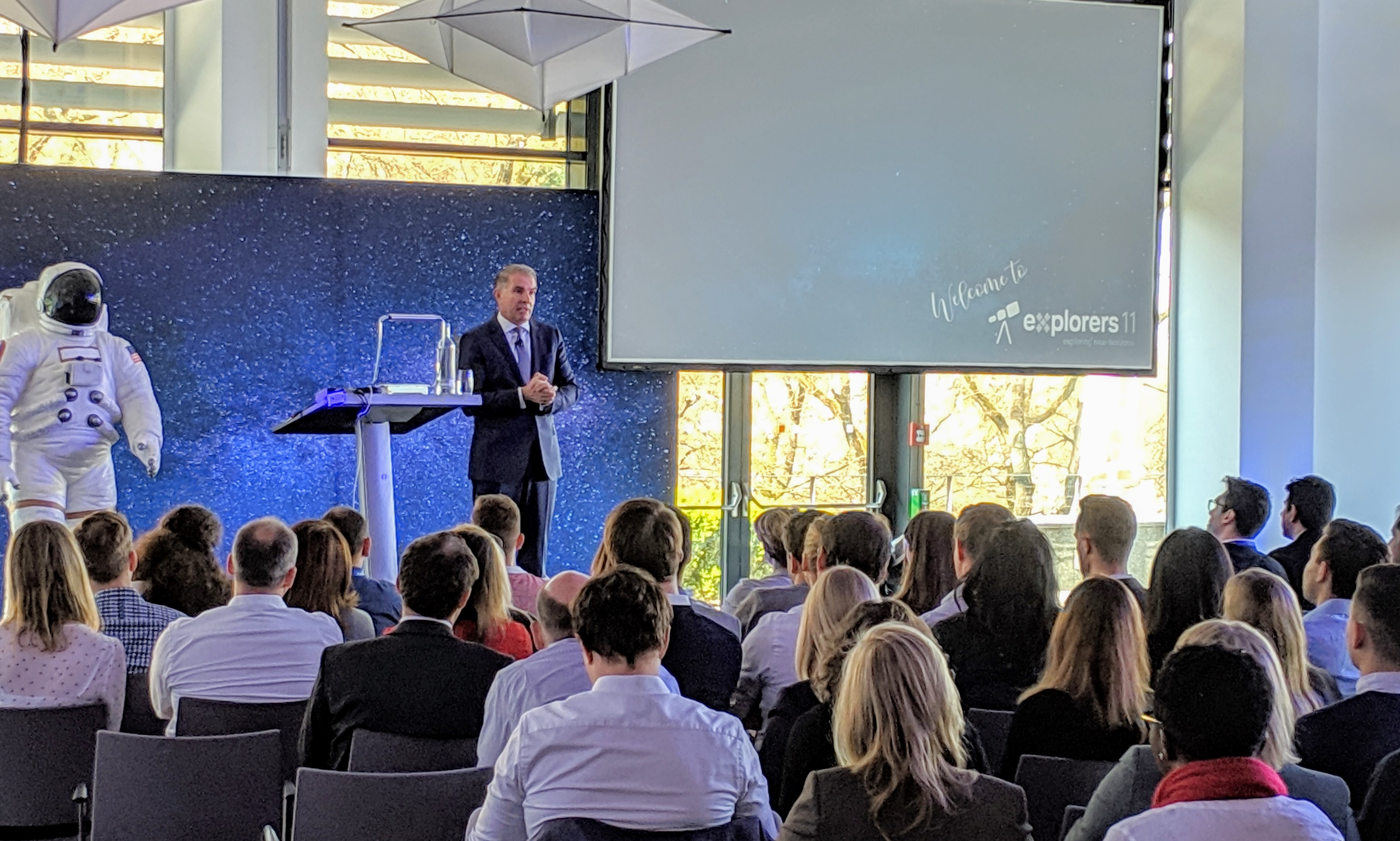
Carsten Spohr addressing staff from Lufthansa Group at Seeheim, Germany in April 2019

After gaining his commercial pilot's license, Spohr enjoyed a brief role at Deutsche Aerospace AG after enrolling in the company's management training programme.

Following this, Spohr joined Lufthansa in 1994. Between 1995 and 1998, he served as the personal assistant to the CEO of the company. After this role, he moved on to head various regional partnerships at Lufthansa, for example in 1998, he became head of regional partner management. He was then soon appointed to lead the group's passenger airline strategy. In 2007, he was made CEO of Lufthansa Cargo. In 2011, in recognition of his loyalty to the company, he was invited to join the executive board.

On 1 May 2014 Spohr took over from Christoph Franz as Chief Executive Officer of Deutsche Lufthansa AG. During his time as CEO there have been poor industrial relations, with a number of strike actions, due to the push to expand Lufthansa's low-cost airline Germanwings. In 2020, Spohr was temporarily assigned the portfolio for digitisation and finance. According to his profile on Bloomberg, his annual compensation amounted to around €2.7 million in 2015. Both in 2019 and in 2023, Spohr's contract was extended for five years.

Spohr described the Germanwings Flight 9525 disaster as "the darkest day for Lufthansa in its 60-year history". In the following years, Spohr guided the company through a collapse in demand triggered by the COVID-19 pandemic and a subsequent government bailout that saw the state take a 20% stake in the company.

In May 2014, Spohr was one of a number of business executives invited to the White House by U.S. President Barack Obama in a meeting aimed at extending job opportunities from international companies to the U.S. During the Hannover Messe in April 2016, he was among the 15 German CEOs who were invited to a private dinner with Obama. Since 2013, Spohr has accompanied Chancellor Angela Merkel on a total of three state visits abroad, including to China (2014) and Abu Dhabi (2017).

== Other activities ==
=== Corporate boards ===
- Munich Re, Member of the Supervisory Board (since 2020)
- Lufthansa Technik, Chairman of the Supervisory Board (since 2014)
- ThyssenKrupp, Member of the Supervisory Board (2013–2019)
- Oetker Group, Member of the Advisory Board (2014-2018)

=== Non-profits ===
- Baden-Badener Unternehmer-Gespräche (BBUG), Member of the Board
- European School of Management and Technology (ESMT), Member of the Board of Trustees
- Federation of German Industries (BDI), Member of the Presidium (2017-2019)
- Rheingau Musik Festival, Member of the Board of Trustees

== Personal life ==
Spohr is married and has two daughters. He and his family currently live in Munich.

Spohr's wife Vivian Alexandra Spohr is head of Lufthansa's Help Alliance which runs aid projects in numerous countries abroad.

Spohr’s brother Matthias Spohr is the Chief Operating Officer (COO) of Lufthansa Group’s subsidiary low-cost airline Eurowings since October 2026. He was the Chief Executive Officer (CEO) and Managing director of Lufthansa Group’s subsidiary Lufthansa Aviation Training from 2021 to 2026.

In July 2025, Vivian Alexandra Spohr was involved in a traffic accident in Porto Cervo, Sardinia, where she killed a 24‑year‑old woman Gaia Costa. Vivian then went back to Germany. She was subsequently placed under investigation for homicide by vehicle (omicidio stradale)
