= Katharine Williams =

Australian judge

The Honourable Justice Katharine Williams

Judge of the Supreme Court of Victoria
- In office 28 October 2002 – 12 February 2015

Personal details
- Born: Katharine Gorman
- Relatives: James P. Gorman (brother)
- Education: Melbourne University
- Occupation: Judge, lawyer

Katharine Williams is a former Trials Division justice at the Supreme Court of Victoria. She was appointed to the bench 28 October 2002 and left 12 February 2015. Williams attended law school at Melbourne University, taking law classes as early as age 16. Williams has 9 siblings, including James P. Gorman, the executive chairman and former CEO of Morgan Stanley.
