= Student Sponsor Partners =

- Founded: 1986
- Founder: Peter Flanigan, Founder
- Type: Nonprofit organization
- Location: New York, NY
- Website: sspnyc.org

Student Sponsor Partners is a non-profit organization based in New York City founded by Peter Flanigan in 1986. Student Sponsor Partners (SSP) gives students in underserved communities across New York City the opportunity to receive a quality private high school education, one-on-one mentorship, and college and career programming.

== History ==
During the winter of 1986, a conversation took place between two bankers on how to help inner-city kids. They decided to try giving these young people scholarships to private schools and mentor these kids throughout their high school careers. The conversation caught wind among some thoughtful individuals. By the following September, 45 sponsors were supporting 45 students at Cardinal Hayes High School and Cathedral High School. Since then, thousands of SSP students have graduated from one of the program's 23 partner high schools across the city.

For more than 30 years, SSP has addressed the high school dropout crisis in New York City by providing students with four years of college-preparatory education and mentorship. All SSP students are paired with sponsors and mentors who offer financial support and one-on-one mentorship, thus making a meaningful impact on their lives while guiding them through their high school careers.

== Program Description ==
The SSP program is composed of three key groups: students (about 1,200 per year), sponsors and mentors, and partner high schools (23). SSP students are selected according to their financial, academic, and social needs. SSP students typically have a family per-capita annual income of less than $10,000, score average or below-average on middle-school reading and/or math standardized tests, and live with a single parent or guardian.

SSP sponsors and mentors are educated professionals who make a four-year commitment to support a student. Mentors become role models for their students and help guide them academically.

SSP partner schools maintain a structured and nurturing learning environment, and they have a long history of educating New York City students. Each school assigns a dedicated coordinator to monitor and support the progress of SSP students and maintain regular contact with SSP families, mentors, and program staff. SSP's 23 participating schools are located in Brooklyn, Queens, Manhattan, the Bronx, and Staten Island. Most of SSP's schools are Catholic schools.

== Statistics ==
Statistics show that:

- About 85 percent of students in the program graduate high school on time. This exceeds the graduation rate of their peers at New York City public schools.
- Ninety-two percent of students attend college, receiving about $25 million in financial aid, grants, and scholarships annually.
- Throughout Student Sponsor Partners' history, students have been the recipients of the New York Times Scholarship, the Gates Millennium Scholar, and the POSSE Foundation Scholarship.

== Participating schools ==
The following schools are part of Student Sponsor Partners as of January 2022:

- Academy of Mount St. Ursula (Girls)
- All Hallows High School (Boys)
- Bishop Loughlin Memorial High School (Co-Ed)
- Cardinal Hayes High School (Boys)
- Cathedral High School (Girls)
- Christ the King Regional High School (Co-Ed)
- Cristo Rey New York High School (Co-Ed)
- Cristo Rey Brooklyn High School (Co-Ed)
- La Salle Academy (Boys)
- Holy Cross High School (Co-Ed)
- Martin Luther School (Co-Ed)
- The Mary Louis Academy (Girls)
- Monsignor McClancy Memorial High School (Co-Ed)
- Monsignor Scanlan High School (Co-Ed)
- Moore Catholic High School (Co-Ed)
- Mount Saint Michael Academy (Boys)
- Nazareth Regional High School (Co-Ed)
- Preston High School (Girls)
- Saint Barnabas High School (Girls)
- St. Francis Preparatory School (Co-Ed)
- St. Jean Baptiste High School (Girls)
- St. Raymond Academy (Girls)
- St. Raymond High School for Boys

== Milestones ==
Year	Milestone
1986	Peter M. Flanigan founds Student Sponsor Partners, and that fall 45 students supported by 45 sponsors and mentors start ninth grade at Cardinal Hayes High School and Cathedral High School in New York City.
1988	SSP expands network to include 11 partner schools and reaches beyond Manhattan and the Bronx into Brooklyn.
1990	SSP sees its first class graduate from the program.
1995	930 SSP students meet with Colin Powell at Cardinal Hayes High School.
1997	For the first time, SSP starts the school year with over 1,000 students in partner schools. Five alumni begin a trend that continues to grow – they themselves became sponsors and mentors.
1998	SSP's partner schools network grows to 20, with schools in every borough except Staten Island.
1999	SSP recruits 410 sponsors and mentors – the largest number to date.
2000	SSP holds its First Annual Founder's Dinner, which raised more than $1 million.
2001	David Dunn, a longtime supporter of SSP, becomes an extraordinary supporter, funding the education of 100 students with a gift totaling $500,000 a year. He later increases his gift to $750,000 annually, which funds 150 students.
2004	347 SSP students graduate in the class of 2004 – the largest SSP graduating class to date.
2008	SSP receives the first of two anonymous $1 million gifts, the largest one-time gift in the organization's history.
2009	SSP hosts its Tenth Annual Founder's Dinner. SSP develops strategic partnerships with organizations like the Diocese of Brooklyn.
2011	SSP celebrates its 25th anniversary. 525 freshman students enter 26 partner schools – the largest entering class in SSP's history. Valerie Rowe, SSP Board Member, donates $1 million to fund the education of 69 students.
2012	SSP honors Colm Kelleher, Co-President of Morgan Stanley Institutional Securities and Head of EMEA and Asia Pacific, at the Thirteenth Annual Founder's Dinner. The event draws 620 guests and raises $2.1 million.
2014	SSP appoints Denise Durham Williams as executive director.
2015	Of the 388 SSP graduating students in the Class of 2015, 96 percent were accepted into college. SSP launches College & Career Success program to ensure SSP high school students receive the tools they need to gain access to the college of their choice and provide them with information to ensure they receive financial funds to ensure they graduate college.
2018	SSP appoints Debra De Jesus-Vizzi as executive director. She was one of the first SSP students, prior to the organization's incorporation.

== Notable donors ==
=== The Flanigan Society ===
- Diocese of Brooklyn
- Carson Family Charitable Trust
- The Clark Foundation
- Dee and Kevin Conway
- Credit Suisse Americas Foundation
- Credit Suisse Fixed Income Division
- David J. And Marilyn B. Dunn
- Peter M. Flanigan
- Goldman, Sachs & Co.
- The Kovner Foundation
- Kate and Robert Niehaus
- Partnership for Inner-city Education
- Valerie and Jack Rowe
- Peter Jay Sharp Foundation
- William E. Simon Foundation
- Tiger Foundation

Members of The Flanigan Society have donated more than $1 million over the course of 25 years.
