= James P. Gorman =

Australian-American financier (born 1958)

James Gorman AO
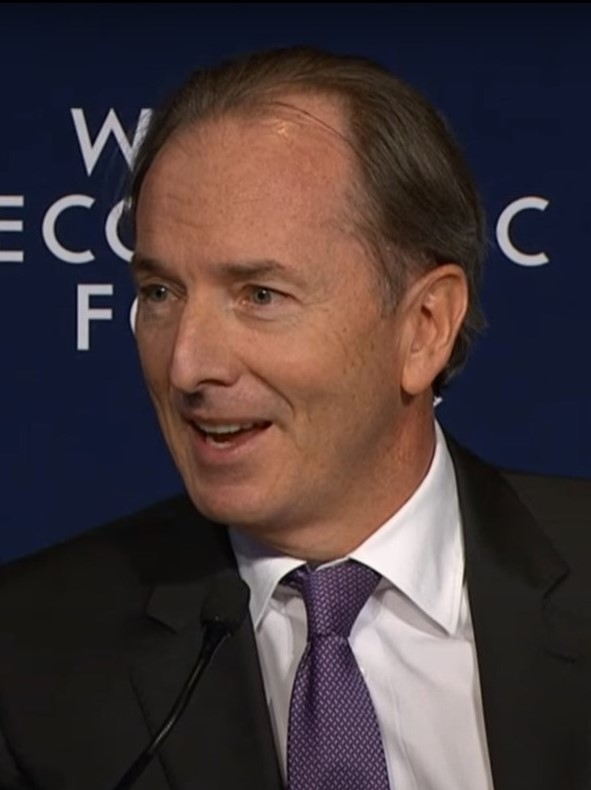
- Gorman in 2016
- Born: James Patrick Gorman; July 14, 1958 (age 67); Melbourne, Australia
- Education: University of Melbourne (BA, LLB); Columbia University (MBA)
- Title: Chairman Emeritus of Morgan Stanley; Chairman of The Walt Disney Company
- Spouse: Pendleton Dedman (m. 1990)
- Children: 2
- Relatives: Katharine Williams (sister)

James Patrick Gorman AO (born July 14, 1958) is an Australian-American businessman and financier. He has been chairman emeritus of Morgan Stanley since January 2025, having been executive chairman from January to December 2024, CEO from January 2010 to December 2023 and chairman from January 2012 to December 2023. He joined the firm in February 2006 and was named co-president in December 2007. Since January 2025, he has been chairman of the Walt Disney Company.

== Early life ==
Gorman was born in Melbourne, Australia. His family is of Irish ancestry. His father R. Kevin Gorman worked as an engineer and headed an engineering consulting company in Melbourne.

He was the sixth of 10 children; his siblings include former Supreme Court of Victoria judge Katharine Williams.

Gorman was educated at Xavier College, a Catholic boarding school for boys in Melbourne. He then studied law at the University of Melbourne, where he earned his Bachelor of Arts and Bachelor of Laws and was a residential member and president of Newman College.

He moved to the United States to obtain a Master of Business Administration from Columbia Business School, which he completed in 1987.

== Career ==
=== Early career ===
In 1982, he joined the law firm Phillips Fox and Masel (now DLA Piper).

After graduating from Columbia Business School in New York City in 1987, he joined McKinsey & Company and eventually became a senior partner in the firm's financial services practice. At McKinsey he worked on the Merrill Lynch account for ten years, and helped develop Merrill's online internet strategy.

In 1999, he joined Merrill Lynch in the newly created role of chief marketing officer. He also joined the 19-member executive management committee. Within two years, he was in charge of Merrill's brokerage business.

=== Morgan Stanley ===
Gorman left Merrill Lynch in February 2006 to join Morgan Stanley as the president and chief operating officer of the Global Wealth Management Group (GWMG). In October 2007, Gorman took on the additional role of co-head of strategic planning with CFO Colm Kelleher. In December 2007, he was named co-president of Morgan Stanley, along with Walid Chammah, with Gorman overseeing wealth management and asset management and Chammah overseeing institutional securities.

In 2009, he helped create the largest wealth management platform globally when he led the merger and integration of Morgan Stanley's wealth management business with Citi's Smith Barney business. Structured as a staggered acquisition, Morgan Stanley purchased the remaining 35% of the Smith Barney business in June 2013, and became a global leader in wealth management with over 16,000 financial advisors and $1.8 trillion in client assets.

In September 2009, it was announced that Gorman would become CEO of Morgan Stanley in January 2010. He assumed the additional title of chairman in January 2012 following the retirement of John J. Mack.

In 2014 he was included in the 50 Most Influential ranking of Bloomberg Markets Magazine.

In January 2020, he was appointed an Officer of the Order of Australia (AO) that recognizes Australians who have demonstrated outstanding service or exceptional achievement. Gorman said he was "honoured to receive this award and extremely proud to represent Australia abroad", adding, "While most of my working life has been in the US my heart remains firmly Australian."

On June 16, 2020, Gorman, alongside Morgan Stanley and one of its Managing Directors, Barry Krouk, were sued by former Managing Director Marilyn Booker as part of a class action lawsuit alleging widespread racial and sexual discrimination. Booker alleged that this discrimination had worsened during Gorman's tenure as CEO, with Booker being dismissed from her position as Global Head of Diversity and being moved into a less prestigious division early on, which itself was eliminated only a year later; Booker further alleged that she was only able to stay due to former CEO John Mack advocating on her behalf. Booker was moved to a new division, the Urban Markets Group, which focused on advocating for fiscal responsibility in local minority communities. Its budget was consistently cut each year, and by 2019, it had dropped to only 71% of its 2011 value. This was accompanied by a noticeable drop in Black financial advisors working for the firm: as of 2019, 99% of its advisors were White, while only 0.63% were Black. Fourteen Black Managing Directors departed the firm between 2017 and 2019, with Booker alleging that this was caused by a culture of indifference toward minority employees. In May 2021, the lawsuit was settled on undisclosed terms.

In October 2020, Morgan Stanley announced two multibillion-dollar acquisitions of E*trade Financial Corp. and Eaton Vance Corp.

Gorman spoke at the November 2022 inaugural Global Financial Leaders' Investment Summit. The Hong Kong Democracy Council claimed that his presence, along with other financial executives, legitimized the Hong Kong government's whitewashing of the erosion of freedoms in the city. Several members of Congress also warned that US financial executives should not attend the Summit, saying "Their presence only serves to legitimise the swift dismantling of Hong Kong's autonomy, free press and the rule of law by Hong Kong authorities acting along with the Chinese Communist Party."

In May 2023, Gorman announced his forthcoming retirement as CEO of Morgan Stanley. He was succeeded as CEO by Ted Pick on January 1, 2024, while remaining executive chairman of the firm's board. In May 2024, Gorman announced he would retire as Chairman at the end of the year. On October 24, 2024, it was announced that CEO Ted Pick would succeed Gorman as Chairman.

=== The Walt Disney Company ===
In October 2024, the Walt Disney Company announced that Gorman would become its new chairman, starting on January 2, 2025.

== Board memberships ==
Outside of Morgan Stanley, Gorman serves as a director of the Walt Disney Company, a director of the Council on Foreign Relations, chair of the board of overseers of the Columbia Business School, and is a member of the Business Council.

He formerly served as a director of the Federal Reserve Bank of New York, president of the Federal Advisory Council to the U.S. Federal Reserve Board, co-chairman of the Partnership for New York City, co-chairman the business committee of the Metropolitan Museum of Art, and chairman of the Securities Industry and Financial Markets Association in Washington, D.C.

== Personal life ==
Gorman passed the US citizenship test in 2004, and is a dual citizen of Australia and the United States. He lives in Manhattan and has two adult children.

Business positions
New title	Chairman Emeritus of Morgan Stanley; 2025–present	Incumbent
Preceded by Mark Parker	Chairman of The Walt Disney Company; 2025–present	Incumbent
Preceded by John J. Mack	CEO of Morgan Stanley; 2010–2024	Succeeded by Ted Pick
Preceded by John J. Mack	Chairman of Morgan Stanley; 2012–2024	Vacant
