= Brady Dougan =

American banker (born 1959)

Brady W. Dougan
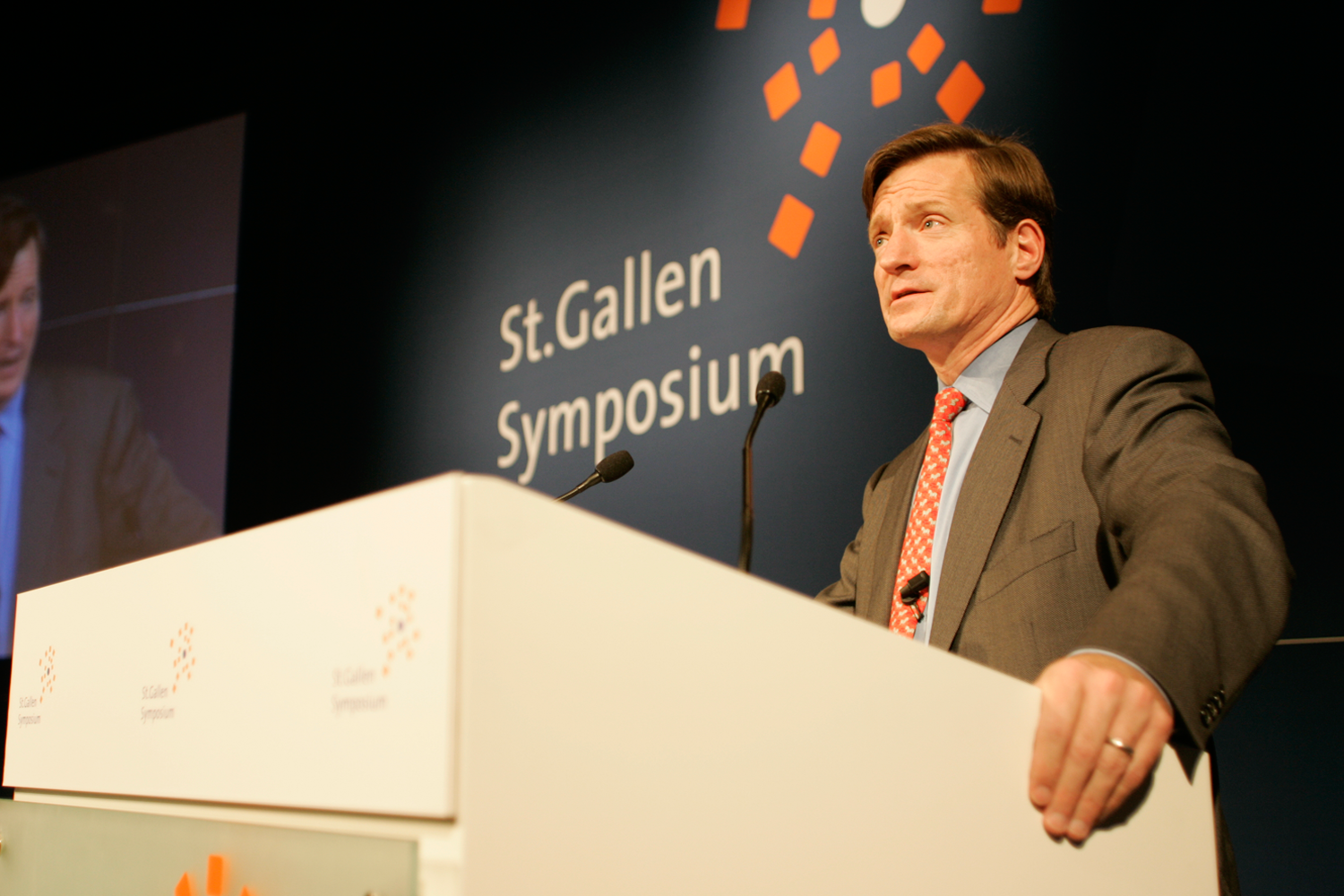
- Dougan at the St. Gallen Symposium in 2009
- Born: Brady William Dougan; August 30, 1959 (age 67); Urbana, Illinois, U.S.
- Education: University of Chicago (BA); University of Chicago Booth School of Business (MBA)
- Occupations: CEO, Credit Suisse
- Spouse: Tomoko Hamada (m. 1988; div. 2009)
- Children: 2

Brady William Dougan (born August 30, 1959) is an American banker and CEO of Exos. From 2007 to 2015, he was the chief executive officer of Credit Suisse. Before this, Dougan was CEO of Investment Banking and acting CEO of Credit Suisse Americas. On 10 March 2015, it was announced that Tidjane Thiam, the CEO of Prudential, would replace Dougan as the next CEO of Credit Suisse in June 2015.

== Early life ==
Dougan received a BA in Economics in 1981 from the University of Chicago and an MBA in Finance in 1982 from the University of Chicago Booth School of Business.

== Career ==
After starting his career in the derivatives group at Bankers Trust, Dougan was hired by Allen Wheat to join Credit Suisse Financial Products in 1990. In 1996, he was named Head of the Equities division, a position he held for five years before being appointed Global Head of the Securities division in 2001. From 2002 to July 2004, he was Co-President, Institutional Services at Credit Suisse First Boston. From 2004 until the merger with Credit Suisse in May 2005, he was CEO of Credit Suisse First Boston. Dougan has served on the Executive Board since 2003. From May 2005 to year-end 2005, he was CEO of the Credit Suisse First Boston division at the Bank. From January 2006 he was CEO Investment Banking and acting CEO Credit Suisse Americas. Since 2007, he is the Group CEO. In March 2015, it was announced that Dougan would leave Credit Suisse in June 2015. Between 2007 and 2014, Brady Dougan received 160 million Swiss francs, while the bank's shares lost 70% of their value.

== Philanthropy ==
Between July 1, 2011 and June 30, 2012, he donated $25,000 or more to Vanderbilt University.

== Personal life ==
In November 1988, Dougan married Tomoko Hamada, in Tokyo, Japan. They had two children, born in 1992 and 1997. Dougan divorced from his wife on May 19, 2009 whilst living in Connecticut.

Dougan has been a long-time resident of Greenwich, Connecticut. He currently resides in Durham, North Carolina.
