= Peter Flanigan =

American investment banker, Nixon aide (1923–2013)

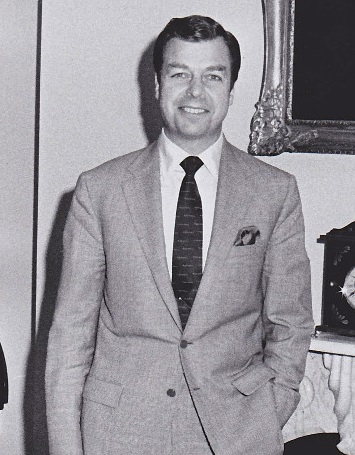
- Peter Flanigan in the 1970s
- Born: June 21, 1923; New York City, New York
- Died: July 29, 2013 (aged 90); Austria
- Occupation: Investment banker
- Known for: Aide and fundraiser for President Nixon

Peter Magnus Flanigan (June 21, 1923 in New York City, New York – July 29, 2013) was an American investment banker who later became an influential aide and fundraiser for President Richard M. Nixon.

== Life ==
Born to wealthy parents, Horace "Hap" Flanigan, a banker, and Aimee (née Magnus) Flanigan, a granddaughter of Adolphus Busch, co-founder of Anheuser-Busch, in Manhattan, Peter Flanigan was raised Catholic. He served as a U.S. Navy carrier pilot during World War II. He graduated summa cum laude from Princeton University and joined the investment firm of Dillon, Read & Company.

== Politics ==
Flanigan, a committed Republican, who had supported Nixon over John F. Kennedy in the 1960 U.S. presidential election, was named Nixon's deputy campaign manager in 1968. He served as a presidential assistant until 1972. Such was Flanigan's influence and support for big business that Ralph Nader labeled him as the "mini-president". He resigned from the Nixon administration in June 1974.

=== Diplomacy ===
Flanigan was nominated as Ambassador Extraordinary and Plenipotentiary (to Spain) by Nixon's successor, President Gerald Ford, however the nomination, which was made on September 17, 1974, was stalled in the Senate and he never received his commission.

== Philanthropy ==
In 1986, Flanigan founded Student Sponsor Partners which provided private education, mentoring and support to students from disadvantaged backgrounds.

== Family ==
Flanigan's first wife, Brigid (née Snow), died in 2006. The couple had five children, one of whom, Sister Louise Marie Flanigan, is a Roman Catholic nun. Flanigan, a widower, married an Austrian national, Dorothea von Oswald, in 2008. The couple had homes in Wildenhag, Oberösterreich, Austria, and in Purchase, New York.

== Death ==
Flanigan died, aged 90, at a hospital in a small town outside Salzburg, Austria, from undisclosed causes.
