= Sergio Ermotti =

Swiss banker (born 1960)

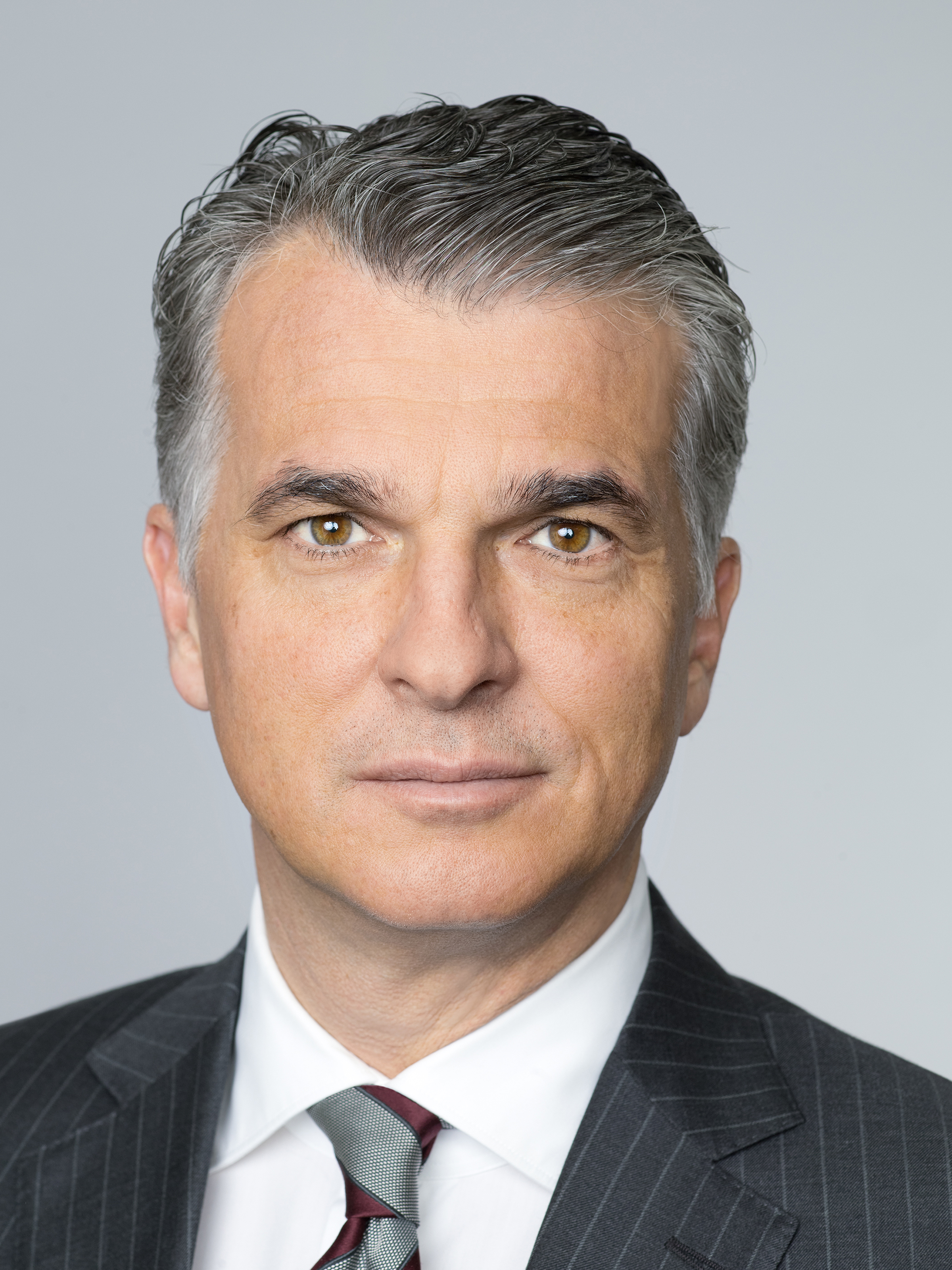
- Ermotti in 2012
- Born: Sergio Pietro Ermotti; 11 May 1960 (age 66); Lugano, Switzerland
- Occupation: CEO
- Employer: UBS
- Term: 2011–20 & April 2023–present
- Predecessor: Ralph Hamers
- Board member of: Ermenegildo Zegna Group; Innosuisse – Swiss Innovation Agency
- Spouse: Tina Ermotti
- Children: 2

Sergio Pietro Ermotti (born 11 May 1960) is a Swiss manager and financial services executive. From April 2021 to April 2023, Ermotti was chairman of Swiss Re, one of the world's largest reinsurance companies, succeeding Walter Kielholz. He was the chief executive officer (CEO) of UBS Group AG from November 2011 to October 2020 and regained that position in 2023. He is also a board member of the Institute of International Finance.

Ermotti took over as Group CEO at UBS after the 2011 rogue trader scandal, implementing strict corporate policies governing community standards. He initiated a major restructuring of the bank, redefining strategy, putting wealth management and Swiss business at its centre, alongside asset management and a more focused and capital-light investment banking. Leading the firm for nearly a decade, he was the longest serving head of UBS. In February 2020, UBS announced that Ralph Hamers, CEO of ING Group, would be succeeding Ermotti as Group CEO on 1 November 2020. Following the acquisition of Credit Suisse by UBS, Ermotti was appointed to lead the UBS Group again, replacing Hamers on 5 April 2023.

It has been speculated that he might transition into Swiss politics after his career in banking. He ruled out entering select political races for the Bundesrat stating that he was "not a politician." In addition to English, Ermotti speaks Italian, German, and French fluently.

== Early life and education ==
Sergio Pietro Ermotti was born on 11 May 1960 in Lugano, Switzerland, an Italian-speaking city. After secondary school he pursued aspirations of being a professional footballer or sports teacher. Before turning 18 and enrolling in college to fulfill these aspirations, Ermotti decided to fill his time with an apprenticeship at the Cornèr Bank in Lugano, where his father was employed, to "get up to speed with accounting, finance, and so on." He invested part of his earnings into a high-yield bond, and at the end of his apprenticeship bought himself a motorbike. Fascinated by foreign exchange trading, he started a training program in the Securities Department of the bank. He received a Swiss federal banking expert diploma and, later in his banking career, attended the Advanced Management Program at Oxford University.

== Banking career ==
After his apprenticeship at the Cornèr Bank, Ermotti was later promoted to trading. In 1986, Ermotti moved to Citibank in Zurich where he traded equity-linked products and later served as its Resident Vice President. In 1987, Ermotti joined Merrill Lynch in Zurich and remained with the firm until 2004. He started with holding various positions in equity derivatives and capital markets, and contributed to the expansion of the capital market business of the bank in Switzerland. In 1993, he was promoted to the position of managing director and moved to London to lead the European equity derivatives unit. Three years later, in 1996, Ermotti relocated to New York, as a head of global derivatives trading where he also worked after his promotion to co-head of global equity markets and a member of the executive management committee for global markets & investment banking at Merrill Lynch.

He joined the Italian bank UniCredit in Milan in December 2005 as head of markets & investment banking after UniCredit had taken over German bank, HypoVereinsbank (HVB). From 2007, he was UniCredit's deputy chief executive officer with responsibility for the strategic business area, corporate and investment banking and private banking. When he was not offered the CEO position after the resignation of the then CEO Alessandro Profumo, he left Unicredit in October 2010. Ermotti was appointed chairman and chief executive of UBS's Europe, Middle East and Africa (EMEA) group, and became a member of the group executive board in April 2011. He was appointed interim group CEO in September 2011 and permanently in November 2011. In response to the 2011 UBS rogue trader scandal, Ermotti sent an internal memo stating: "I want to make clear that no one's personal interest nor any amount of revenue is worth more than the bank's reputation."

Because of his new responsibility as CEO, he resigned from his position as a president of Darwin Airline in 2011. Ermotti was a member of the board at the London Stock Exchange from October 2007 to July 2013. In 2012, he tapped a colleague from Merrill Lynch, Andrea Orcel, to lead UBS' investment banking arm, eventually assisting him in navigating the 2013 Libor trading scandal, a major corporate restructuring and a major expansion of mergers and acquisitions (M&A) activity. When UBS AG was converted into a holding company in 2014, Ermotti was elected group CEO of UBS Group AG. In 2015, the Swiss newspaper Schweiz am Sonntag named him as the most successful manager of a company listed on the Swiss Market Index. His salary in fiscal year 2017 was estimated to be US$14.9 million.

In February 2020, UBS announced that Ralph Hamers CEO of ING Group would succeed Ermotti as CEO in November 2020. Following the acquisition of Credit Suisse by UBS, Ermotti was appointed to lead the UBS Group again, replacing Hamers in April 2023. In 2024, he received a compensation package totaling 14.9 million Swiss francs (approximately $16.8 million), maintaining his position as Europe's highest-paid bank executive. This remuneration has sparked discussions within Switzerland regarding the implementation of caps on executive pay (in Switzerland, lawmakers are considering a 5 million franc cap on executive compensation). Despite this, 86.7% of UBS shareholders approved the compensation. The bank justifies the amount due to Ermotti's leadership in integrating Credit Suisse after its 2023 acquisition.

== Chairmanships and board memberships ==
In March 2020, Swiss Re, one of the world's largest reinsurance companies, nominated Ermotti for election to its board of directors and announced its intention to onboard him as its next chairman, succeeding Walter Kielholz in 2021. Due to his new role at UBS, he stepped down from this position at the end of April 2023.

Ermotti is lead non-executive director of Ermenegildo Zegna N.V. He is also a board member of Innosuisse, the Swiss Innovation Agency.

== Personal life ==
Ermotti is married with two sons. His favorite movies are George Roy Hill's The Sting and Ken Kesey's One Flew Over the Cuckoo's Nest. He supports the Swiss football club FC Lugano and the Italian football club A.C. Milan. Ermotti owns a villa in Montagnola and a holiday home in Engadin.

Ermotti was challenged by Marc Walder, CEO of Swiss media company Ringier, and Gianluigi Bianchi, managing partner for Europe of Wealth-X, to undertake the ALS Ice Bucket Challenge.

== See also ==
- Banking in Switzerland
