= Christoph Franz =

Swiss-German businessman

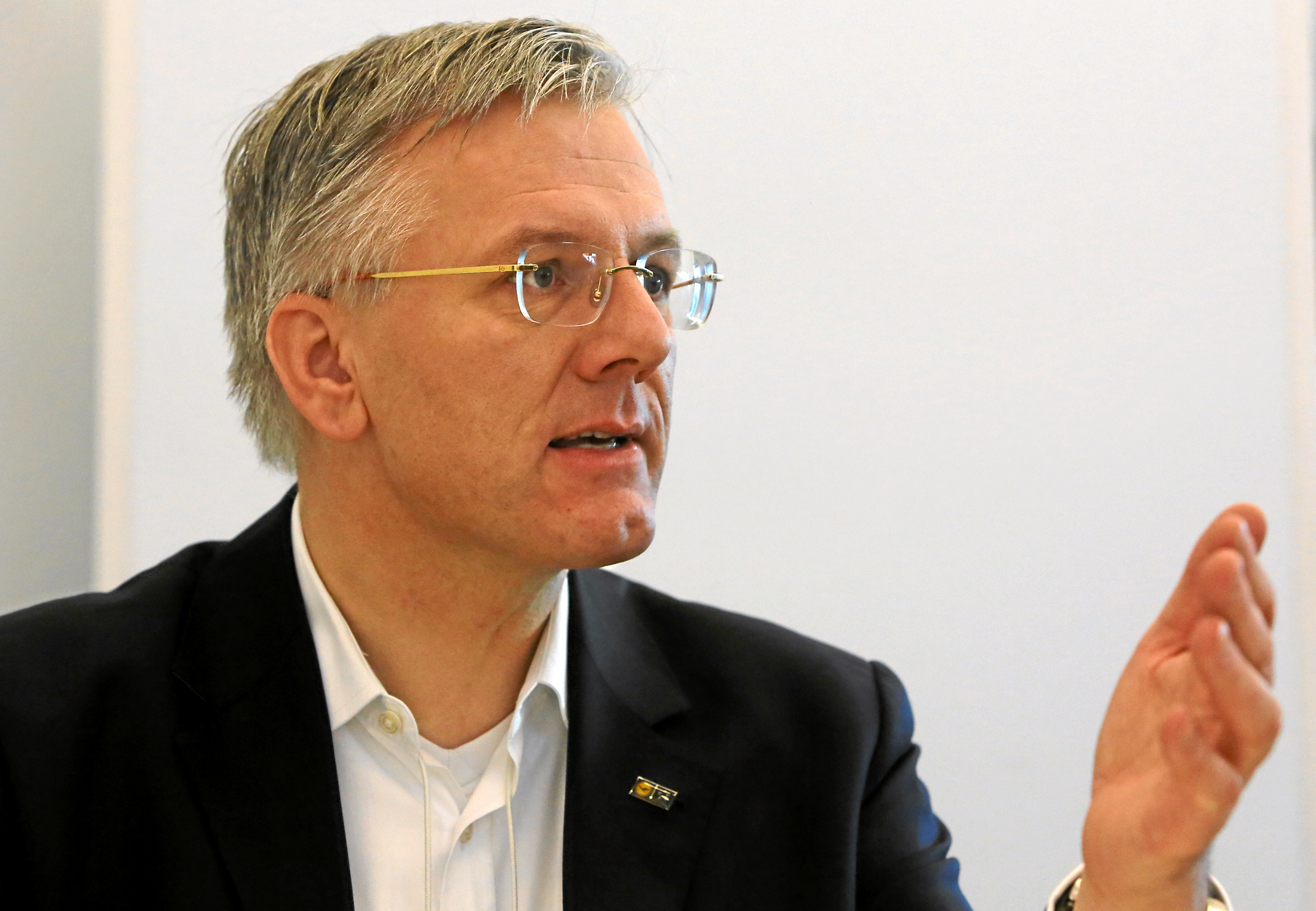
Franz at the World Economic Forum Annual Meeting in 2013

Christoph Franz (born 2 May 1960 in Frankfurt) is a German engineer and manager who was chief executive officer of Lufthansa from 2011 until 2014.

== Early life and education ==
Franz studied industrial engineering at the Technical University of Darmstadt and completed his studies with a Ph.D. in economic sciences at the same university. He also studied at the École centrale de Lyon and conducted post-doctorate research at the University of California, Berkeley.

== Career ==
Franz joined Lufthansa in 1990. During that time, he was involved in Lufthansa's turnround following the Gulf War, when he worked in the office of Jürgen Weber, the then chief executive.

In 1994 Franz moved to German railway operator Deutsche Bahn. From 2004 until 2009 he was CEO of Swiss International Air Lines.

From 1 January 2011 until 30 April 2014 he was CEO of Deutsche Lufthansa AG as successor of Wolfgang Mayrhuber. During his time in office, he sought to fight back against the budget airlines by eliminating duplication between Lufthansa's point-to-point short-haul services and Germanwings. Also under his leadership, Lufthansa completed the sale of its UK subsidiary British Midland International to International Airlines Group.

In 2011, Franz accompanied Chancellor Angela Merkel on an official trip to Kenya, Angola, and Nigeria.

In 2013, Franz stepped down as chief executive of Lufthansa midway through the airline's restructuring programme to become chairman of the Swiss pharmaceutical company Roche the following year. He had been a member of Roche's board since 2011.

== Other activities ==
=== Corporate boards ===
- Deutsche Bahn, Chair of the Supervisory Board (since 2026)
- Deutsche Flugsicherung (DFS), Member of the Advisory Board
- Chugai Pharmaceutical Co., Member of the Board of Directors (since 2017)
- Zurich Insurance Group, Member of the Board of Directors (since 2014)
- Stadler Rail, Member of the Board of Directors (since 2011)
- Swiss International Air Lines, Member of the Board of Directors (2009-2016)
- JetBlue, Member of the Board of Directors (2008-2011)

=== Non-profit organizations ===
- Avenir Suisse, Member of the Board of Trustees
- Baden-Badener Unternehmer-Gespräche (BBUG), Member of the Board
- European Round Table of Industrialists (ERT), Member
- Lucerne Festival, Member of the Board of Trustees
- University of Zurich, Swiss Institute of International Studies (SIAF), Member of the Board of Trustees
- University of Zurich, Department of Economics, Member of the Advisory Board
- University of St. Gallen, Member of the advisory board (since 2018)
- International Committee of the Red Cross (ICRC), Member of the Assembly (since 2017)
