= Ralph Hamers =

Dutch private banker (born 1966)

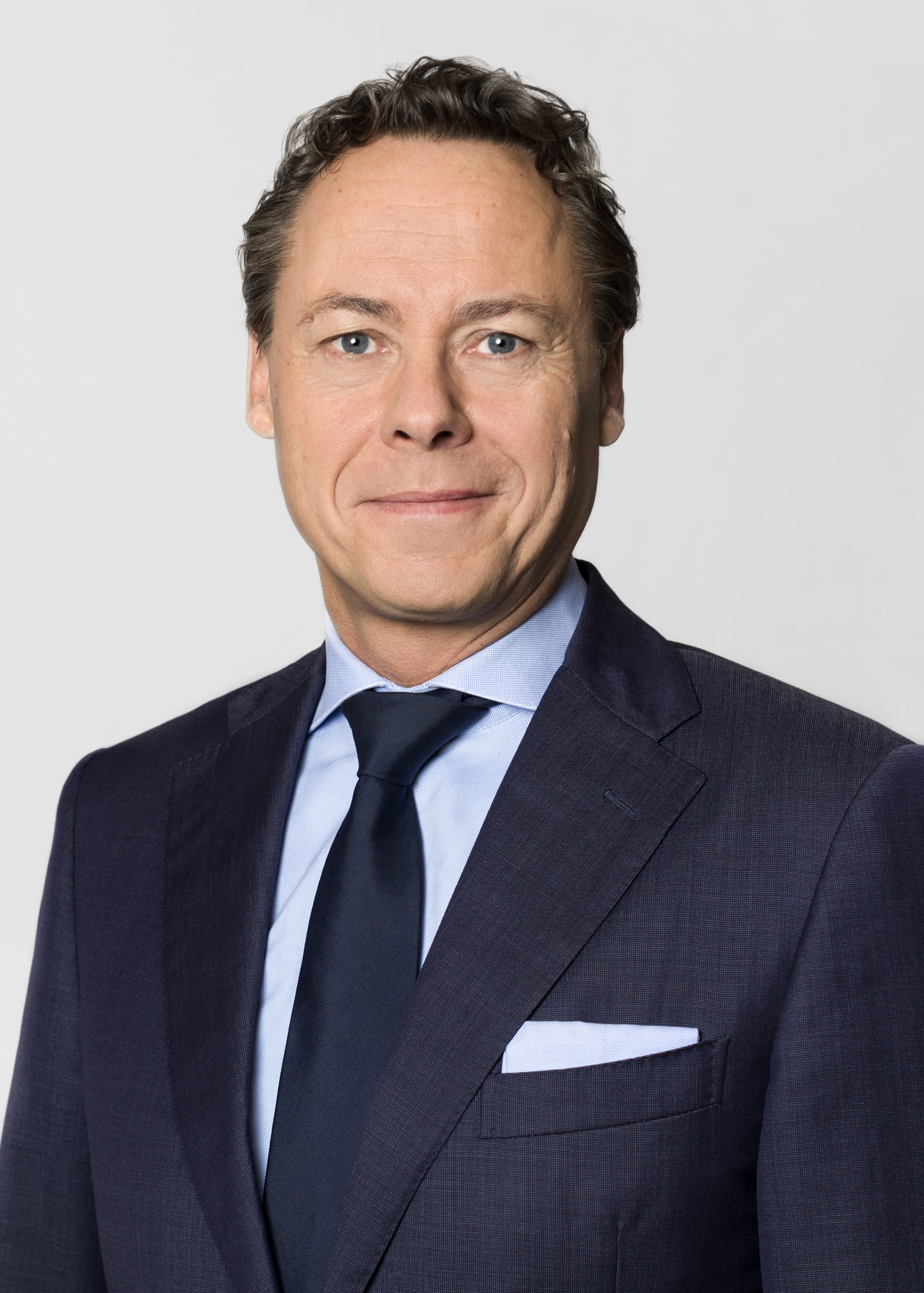
- Hamers in 2015
- Born: Ralph Adrianus Joseph Gerardus Hamers; 25 May 1966 (age 60); Simpelveld, Netherlands
- Education: Tilburg University
- Children: 2

Ralph Adrianus Joseph Gerardus Hamers (born 25 May 1966) is a Dutch businessman who was the chief executive officer (CEO) of UBS Group from September 2020 to April 2023. He was the CEO of Dutch bank ING Group from October 2013 until June 2020.

== Early life ==
Ralph Hamers was born on 25 May 1966. He holds a master of science (MS) in business econometrics/operations research from Tilburg University.

== Career ==
Hamers joined UBS in September 2020 as a member of the group executive board and became group CEO on 1 November 2020, replacing Sergio Ermotti.

Prior to UBS, Hamers spent 29 years at Dutch bank ING Group.

Hamers joined ING in 1991 and was the CEO of ING Group from 1 October 2013 to June 2020. During his time as CEO, he steered the bank to profitability while repaying the Dutch government money it received during the financial crisis. Also under his leadership, ING Group invested heavily in its digital transformation, relying far more on its online offering and less on its branch network than most rivals, leading to the bank having one of the lowest cost-to-revenue ratios in Europe at the time.

In 2018, there was an uproar in the Netherlands following a proposal to raise Hamers' yearly salary from 1.6 million euro to 3 million euro. Following the uproar, the Board withdrew the offer, leaving his salary unchanged.

In December 2020, a Dutch court ordered the public prosecutor to open a probe into Hamers' involvement in his previous role as CEO of ING Group in ING Netherlands' failure to comply with anti-money laundering regulations in 2018. The investigation was settled in 2018 with a €775 million fine paid by ING Netherlands and, according to Bloomberg News, the public prosecutor stated that "it didn’t find enough evidence for criminal accusations against individuals at ING, including the top management". In the end, The Hague Court of Appeal decided (Dec. 2025) that Ralph Hamers, former CEO of ING Group, will not be prosecuted.

Shortly after the acquisition of Credit Suisse by UBS in March 2023, Hamers stepped down as CEO with Sergio Ermotti returning as CEO. Hamers would take on a role as an advisor during a transition period.

Hamers wrote a book about his experience with ING Bank and UBS, titled "Do Your Thing; lessons from banking's biggest digital transformations".

== Other activities ==
- Institute of International Finance (IIF), Member of the Board.
- Palo Alto Networks, Member of the Board of Directors (since Feb. 2025)
- Arta Finance, a digital wealth management company, Senior Advisor (Oct. 2025)
- Banking Circle Group, Chairman of the Group Board of Directors (since April 2026)
- Scotia Bank, independent member of the Board of Directors (since September 2026)

== Personal life ==
Hamers is married, with twins.
