= Avenir Suisse =

Swiss think tank

Coordinates: 47.3893°N 8.5188°E

Avenir Suisse is a classical liberal think tank focused on Switzerland’s future in political, economical and social areas. Its main goal is to stimulate the public debate and to provide new ideas through the publication of studies and the regular organisation of events and seminars. It encourages a liberal vision of the world and the society. Its fellow and research team comprises mostly graduates in economy, political economy and political science (with 5 women and 11 men in 2025). The foundation employs a total of 31 people.

Avenir Suisse is a nonprofit foundation with headquarters in Zurich. The foundation has a yearly budget of 5 million Swiss Francs and its fund reaches 50 million. The foundation is completely free in its research and content.

Founded in 1999 by 14 of the most important Swiss multinationals, Avenir Suisse is nowadays supported by 130 donors: Swiss companies as well as individuals.

== Organisation ==
Avenir Suisse is present in Zurich (head office) and in Lausanne (French-speaking office). Since August 2023, Jürg Müller is Avenir Suisse’s manager, succeeding Peter Grünenfeld (2016–2023) and Gerhard Schwarz (2010–2016). Before him, Thomas Held was the manager of the foundation since its creation in 1999. Jérôme Cosandey is the French-speaking manager, succeeding Tiber Adler (2014–2019). Xavier Comtesse was the first French-speaking manager of the foundation (2002–2014).

The Chairman of the Board since May 2020 has been Michel Liès, a French-born former CEO of the insurance company Swiss RE and current Chairman of the Board of Directors of Zurich Insurance. He succeeds Andreas Schmid, Chairman of the Board of Directors of Flughafen Zürich AG, who in turn succeeded Rolf Soiron in this position in 2014.

The governance of the think tank relies on: – the foundation board that approves budgets, the annual financial results and nominates the management, – the steering committee that supervises the foundation and prepares the meetings of the council of the foundation, – the nomination committee that designates the members of each commission, – the program commission that recommends the topics and guarantees of the quality and methodology of each project, – the finance committee that audits the budget and the annual and quarterly reports.

== Approach ==
According to its mission statement, Avenir Suisse “wants to contribute to the formation of new ideas concerning economics, politics and the society at large.” It follows “a liberal agenda and represents a market oriented position.” Thus it postulates that “it cannot be in the first place the task of the State to solve the problems on the agenda.” Still, the think tank “doesn’t play an active part in the process of politic consults or campaigns of votes.” But to be “an animator of the public debate.”

The foundation’s publications tackle social, political and economical topics such as energy and environment, tax policies, professional training, old-age savings or the political system at large. The think tank also handles actual subjects such as: the work of seniors, the strong franc policy and the financial equalization between cantons.

== Publications ==
Since its founding, the think tank has published hundreds of papers, mainly in German and in French. Following list contains a selection of monographs:

- “Guaranteed Benefits for Cantonal Banks” (February 2025)
- “Rethinking the Pension System” (November 2024)
- “The Return of Industrial Policy?” (March 2024)
- “Choosing a Career: One Step Closer to Gender Equality” (May 2024)
- “Real Bracket Creep in Switzerland” (April 2024)
- “The Return of Industrial Policy?” (March 2024)
- “The Bachelor’s Degree, an Underestimated Diploma” (March 2024)
- “Energy Policy under Strain” (November 2023)
- “Innovation without Borders” (September 2023)
- “Myths around Rents” (September 2023)
- “More Value in Healthcare” (May 2023)
- “Betting on the Wrong Regulatory Cards” (April 2022)
- “Security Policy Perspectives” (March 2022)
- "Switzerland, the Land of Subsidies” (March 2022)
- “Continuing Swiss Industry's Success Story” (October 2021)
- “Free movement of persons and accompanying measures” (May 2017)
- “A solid foundation for the age pyramid” (April 2017)
- “Liberal shadow budget” (March 2017)
- “Structural change in the Swiss mountain region” (February 2017)
- “NFA 2 – Towards a Revitalisation of Swiss Federalism” (January 2017)
- “New online publication: Avenir Suisse Freedom Index 2016” (December 2016)
- “The Myth of the Family Silver” (November 2016)
- “An endurance test for budgetary policy” (October 2016)
- “Trade rather than protectionism” (October 2016)
- “Negative interest rates: an experiment with an uncertain outcome” (July 2016)
- “Switzerland 1995 2035” (June 2016)
- “New Measures for Old Age Care” (June 2016)
- “Ways out of the regulatory jungle II” (March 2016)
- “Growth – why, how much and how” (January 2016)
- “Where does Switzerland stand?” (January 2016)
- “Bilateralism – what else?” (December 2015)
