= Swiss Re =

Swiss reinsurance company

Swiss Re Ltd

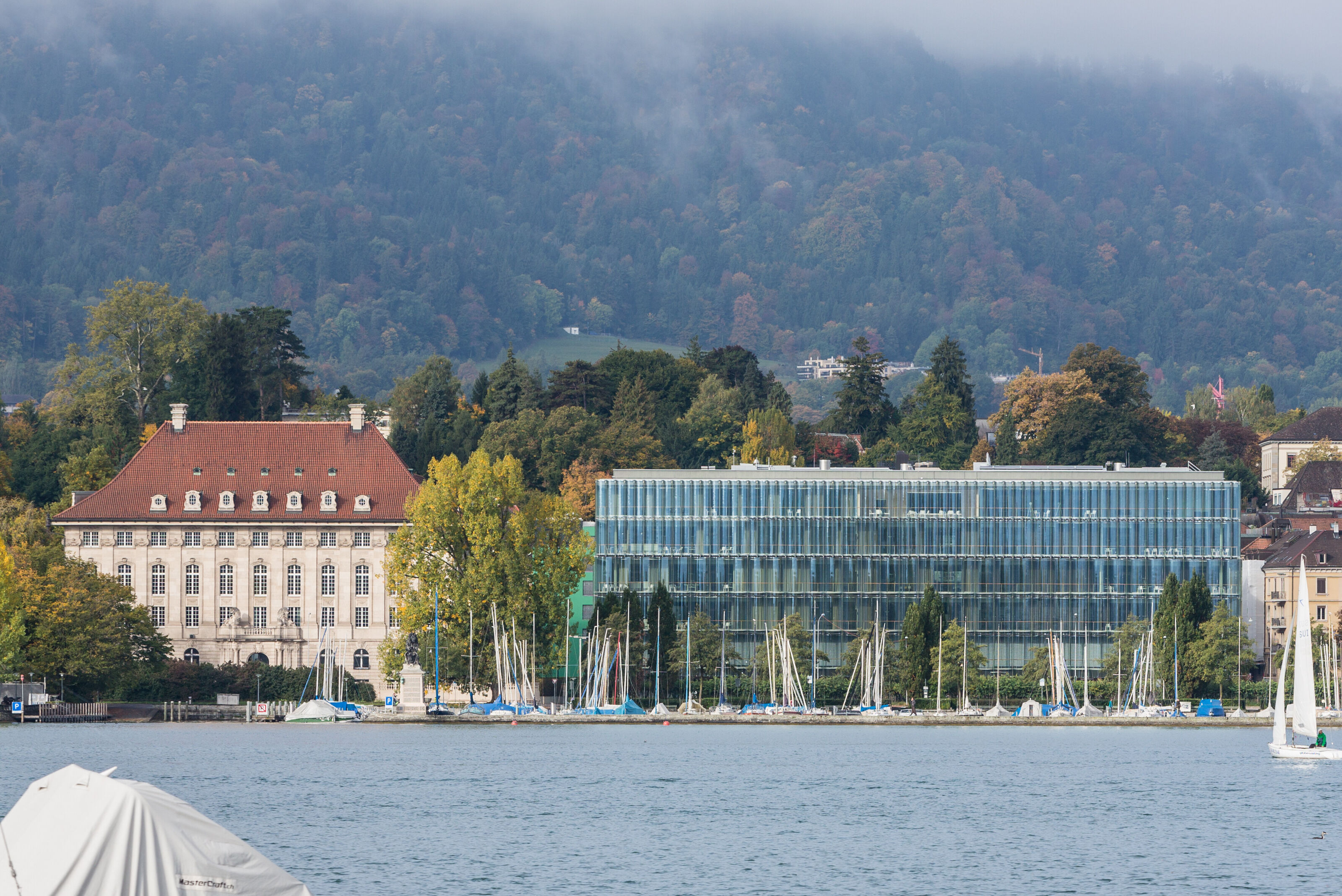
- Headquarters at Mythenquai
- Trade name: Swiss Re
- Type: Aktiengesellschaft
- Traded as: SIX: SREN; Swiss Market Index component
- ISIN: CH0126881561
- Industry: Insurance services
- Predecessor: Schweizerische Rückversicherungs-Gesellschaft AG
- Founded: 19 December 1863; 162 years ago
- Headquarters: Zürich, Switzerland
- Key people: Andreas Berger (Group CEO); Jacques de Vaucleroy (Chairman)
- Products: Reinsurance, insurance, asset management
- Revenue: ▲US$ 43.1 billion (2025)
- Net income: ▲US$4.8 billion (2025)
- Total assets: ▲US$179.576 billion (end 2023)
- Total equity: ▲US$25.1 billion (end 2025)
- Number of employees: 14,893 (end 2025)
- Website: www.swissre.com

Swiss Re Ltd is a Swiss reinsurance company founded in 1863 and headquartered in Zürich, Switzerland. It is one of the world's largest reinsurers, as measured by gross premiums written. Swiss Re operates through around 80 offices in 29 countries and employs over 14,000 people. It was ranked 519th on the Forbes Global 2000 list and ranked 316th on the Fortune Global 500 in 2023. Swiss Re is listed on the SIX Swiss Exchange.

== History ==
On 10–11 May 1861, more than 500 houses went up in flames in the town of Glarus, Switzerland. Two-thirds of the town was reduced to rubble and ash and around 3,000 inhabitants were made homeless. The damage to Glarus exceeded the reserves of the cantonal fire insurance, which had underinsured many cantonal buildings; the resulting loss was covered by donations, as well as a bond issue by the cantonal government. Similar to the fire of Hamburg in 1842, which led to the foundation of the first professional reinsurers in Germany, the fire of Glarus made Swiss insurers demand more reinsurance coverage against catastrophic loss. As a result, Swiss Re was founded in Zürich as the first Swiss reinsurance company in 1863.

Swiss Re was a lead insurer of the World Trade Center at the time of the September 11 attacks, which led to an insurance dispute with the owner, Silverstein Properties. In October 2006, the New York appeals court ruled in favor of Swiss Re, stating that the destruction of the twin towers was a single event rather than two, limiting coverage to US$3.5 billion.

Swiss Re acquired the GE Insurance Solutions property/casualty business in 2006, which made it the world's largest reinsurer.

In 2009 Warren Buffett invested $2.6 billion when Swiss Re raised more equity capital after it lost 6 billion francs in its financial market operations in the 2008 financial crisis. Berkshire Hathaway already owned a 3% stake, with rights to own more than 20%.

In May 2016, the Fort McMurray Canadian wildfires caused estimated damages of up to CAD10 billion, with Swiss Re having the most exposure among reinsurers.

On 1 July 2004, Swiss Re subsidiary Admin Re began the acquisition of Life Assurance Holding Corporation in the UK. On 31 October 2008, Swiss Re completed a £762 million acquisition of Barclays PLC's subsidiary Barclays Life Assurance Company Ltd. In June 2014, the company, through Admin Re, acquired the UK pensions business of HSBC Life (UK) Limited worth £4.2 billion. The Admin Re business, which was renamed ReAssure, was eventually sold to Phoenix Group Holdings for £3.2bn in July 2020.

By February 2022, Swiss Re had acquired Champlain Reinsurance Company (Champlain Re), a Swiss-based run-off reinsurance captive of Alcan Holdings Switzerland AG, a member of Rio Tinto Alcan, in a legacy transaction. Later that month, Swiss Re declared a net profit of US$1.6 billion, a bounce-back from previous losses in 2020. Still, the exposure to COVID-19 in America was excessive; together with increased damages from natural catastrophes, profits were well below the US$1.8 billion estimate. Swiss Re was able to make up for some of its losses due to its increased property business. At the same time, the board of directors assured investors that the company is only minimally exposed to losses during the Ukraine crisis.

In December 2023, Swiss Re announced it had acquired research-led flood risk intelligence firm Fathom, which would retain its brand while working closely with the Reinsurance Solutions division to further develop and distribute its flood maps and models.

== Business structure ==
Swiss Re Group operates through three business units:

- Property & Casualty Reinsurance
- Life & Health Reinsurance
- Corporate Solutions

== Leadership ==
Swiss Re's leadership consists of the board of directors and the group executive committee.

In April 2024, Swiss Re appointed Andreas Berger as group CEO, effective 1 July 2024 replacing Christian Mumenthaler, who had been group CEO since 2016.

== Public controversies / #MeToo Allegations ==
=== Sexual harassment and discrimination allegations ===
Swiss Re has faced at least two public allegations and legal proceedings related to sexual harassment and gender discrimination.

==== Julia Sommer employment tribunal (2022–2024) ====
In 2022, a London employment tribunal ruled that Julia Sommer, a political risk underwriter employed at Swiss Re's London office from 2017 until her redundancy in 2021, had been the victim of sex discrimination, harassment, maternity-related discrimination, and unfair dismissal. The tribunal accepted that Robert Llewellyn, then global head of Swiss Re's political risk and trade credit team, had made sexually explicit remarks to Sommer, and found that on a further occasion—where she was told to "shut up" and to take a "more submissive role"—she would not have been treated the same way had she been male.

Sommer alleged she had been the victim of a "calculated campaign" to dismiss her, and described the remarks as having "undermined my professional credibility in a public professional setting." She claimed that during her maternity leave she was overlooked for two senior positions, and that upon returning to work she was excluded and subsequently made redundant in 2021 through what she described as a sham process.

In 2023, Sommer was awarded approximately £1.2 million by the tribunal. She subsequently brought a further claim of £5.1 million, telling the court that the damage to her mental health and professional reputation left her unable to continue working in insurance or financial services. Llewellyn, who had by that point left Swiss Re, denied the claims.

Swiss Re said it "noted the tribunal's conclusions" and was giving them "full and careful consideration," adding that it "does not tolerate discrimination of any kind and is committed to providing an equal and inclusive workplace for all employees."

==== Russell Higginbotham investigation (2024–2026) ====
In January 2026, Inside Paradeplatz, an independent Swiss financial news platform founded by Zurich-based investigative journalist Lukas Hässig, and recognised in 2013 by the European Press Prize for investigative journalism, reported that Russell Higginbotham, a 30-year Swiss Re veteran who had been appointed CEO of Reinsurance Solutions in 2022, had unexpectedly relinquished the role at the end of 2024, with Jonathan Rake taking over from early 2025. According to the report, Higginbotham continued to be listed on the Swiss Re website as head of Swiss Re for an extended period after his departure, with sources indicating he had remained on the payroll while the company conducted an internal investigation on harassment claims relating to sexual misconduct before being formally separated under an exit agreement. Inside Paradeplatz noted that sources who were familiar with the investigation quoted that the Board and senior management were aware of the allegations for months when the story broke on its platform.

A subsequent Inside Paradeplatz report in May 2026 detailed the allegations further: that Higginbotham had sent inappropriate messages to a female employee for whom he had been a mentor, and had allegedly pressured her. The outlet reported that during the relevant period Higginbotham had reported to Andreas Berger, who had succeeded Christian Mumenthaler as Group CEO of Swiss Re in 2024, and that ultimate responsibility for the handling of the internal investigation therefore rested with the group's chief executive. The article also raised questions about the governance of the matter, including how and when Switzerland's financial-market regulator FINMA had been informed. According to Inside Paradeplatz, Swiss Re's internal review resulted in no significant disciplinary consequences, and Higginbotham had reportedly remained on payroll throughout the investigation period.

The woman at the center of the allegations filed a criminal complaint with police in England. Sussex Police confirmed receipt of the report, stating: "The report has been recorded, and we have been in contact with the victim to provide advice on reporting the matter to the police in Singapore, as they are the appropriate authority to investigate."

== Other Criticism ==
In November 2023, the Brazilian reporting collective Reporter Brazil, drawing on research supported by the Swiss NGO Public Eye, reported that between 2016 and 2022 Swiss Re had, in at least 19 cases, insured companies that Brazilian authorities had documented as carrying out illegal rainforest deforestation and that were consequently listed on a public register. Swiss Re had also reportedly signed contracts with Brazilian farmers operating illegally in Indigenous protected areas, some of whom had used violence against Indigenous people. At the time one such contract was signed, the customer in question was a defendant in the murder of an Indigenous person, killed during an attack by a group of farmers on an Indigenous community. Swiss Re had additionally insured a coffee plantation whose operators were under investigation for slave labor and child labor. When confronted with these allegations — which, according to Reporter Brazil, contradicted, among other things, the insurer's own sustainability guidelines — Swiss Re said it remained "fully and completely committed to the company's sustainability ambitions and goals." As for the customers found guilty of illegal deforestation, Swiss Re said it was reviewing the information, noting that the contracts in question had already expired and had not been renewed. According to the SonntagsZeitung, no reason was given for the non-renewal.

== Offices ==
=== Zürich headquarters ===
Swiss Re is headquartered in Mythenquai, Zürich. Six buildings form Campus Mythenquai, with its historic headquarters being in the Altbau which was built in 1913. The majority of Swiss Re's headquarters staff are located in the adjacent Swiss Re Next building.

=== London office ===
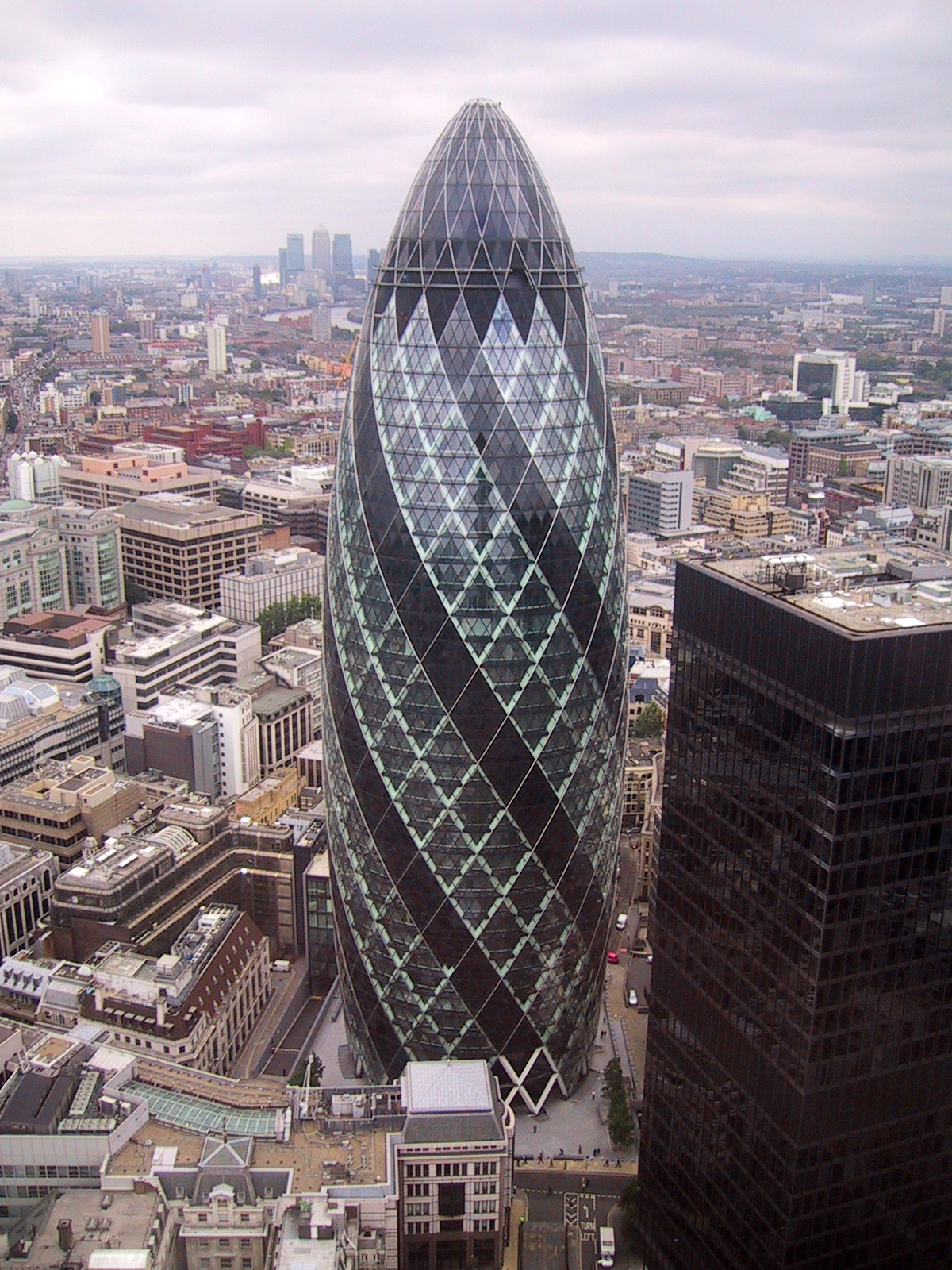
Swiss Re office in London, UK

Its London office is located in the 30 St Mary Axe tower, which opened on 25 May 2004. The landmark London skyscraper, designed by architect Norman Foster and popularly known as "the Gherkin", was sold in February 2007 for over £600 million to IVG Immobilien AG of Germany and the Evans Randall property investment firm.

=== New York offices ===
Swiss Re has two offices in New York; its Manhattan office is located at 1301 Avenue of the Americas. The larger of the two offices is located in Armonk and overlooks the Kensico reservoir.

=== Canadian offices ===
Swiss Re has two Canadian offices, in Toronto and Vancouver; Swiss Reinsurance Company Canada was named one of Greater Toronto's Top Employers by Mediacorp Canada, Inc., in October 2008, as announced by the Toronto Star.

== See also ==
- Geneva Association
- Institute of International Finance
- World Economic Forum
