= List of trading losses =

The following contains a list of trading losses of the equivalent of US$100 million or higher. Trading losses are the amount of principal losses in an account. Because of the secretive nature of many hedge funds and fund managers, some notable losses may never be reported to the public. The list is ordered by the real amount lost, starting with the greatest.

This list includes both fraudulent and non-fraudulent losses, but excludes those associated with Bernie Madoff's Ponzi scheme (estimated in the $50 billion range) as Madoff's losses were not from trading.

Nominal amount lost	USD FX rate	USD equivalent	USD inflation to 2007	2007 USD amount lost	Country	Company	Source of loss	Year	Person(s) associated with incident
Nominal amount lost	at time of loss		USD inflation to 2007	2007 USD amount lost	Country	Company	Source of loss	Year	Person(s) associated with incident
USD 35 bn	1	USD 35 bn	-37.6%	USD 21.83 bn	United States	Situational Awareness	Leveraged trading of AI-related stocks	2026	Leopold Aschenbrenner
USD 10 bn	1	USD 10 bn	-19.4%	USD 8.06 bn	United States	Archegos Capital Management	Total return swaps	2021	Bill Hwang
USD 9 bn	1	USD 9 bn	−3.7%	USD 8.67 bn	United States	Morgan Stanley	Credit Default Swaps	2008	Howie Hubler
USD 9 bn	1	USD 9 bn	−7.0%	USD 8.37 bn	United Kingdom	JPMorgan Chase	Credit Default Swaps	2012	Bruno Iksil
USD 7 bn	1	USD 8 bn	−12.3%	USD 7.01 bn	China	Tsingshan Holding Group	Short positions on nickel	2022	
USD 6.12 (EUR 4.9) bn	0.679	USD 7.22 bn	−3.7%	USD 6.95 bn	France	Société Générale	European Index Futures	2008	Jérôme Kerviel
USD 6.5 bn	1	USD 6.50 bn	2.8%	USD 6.69 bn	United States	Amaranth Advisors	Gas Futures	2006	Brian Hunter
USD 4.6 bn	1	USD 4.6 bn	27.2%	USD 5.85 bn	United States	Long Term Capital Management	Bond Arbitrage	1998	John Meriwether
EUR 4 bn				USD 4 bn	Netherlands	PFZW	Oil futures	2020	
USD 4.5 bn	1	USD 4.5 bn	-19.4%	USD 3.6 bn	United States	Melvin Capital	Short positions on Gamestop and other US equities	2021	Gabe Plotkin
USD 4.1 bn	1	USD 4.1 bn	-14.9%	USD 3.49 bn	United States	Pershing Square	Valeant Pharmaceuticals	2015-2017	Bill Ackman
JPY 285 bn	108.78	USD 2.62 bn	32.1%	USD 3.46 bn	Japan	Sumitomo Corporation	Copper Futures	1996	Yasuo Hamanaka
USD 4.2 bn		USD 4.2 bn		USD 4.2 bn	Singapore	Three Arrows Capital	Cryptocurrency speculation	2022	Kyle Davies & Su Zhu
EUR 2.7 bn	1	USD 2.7 bn	−7.0%	USD 2.7 bn	Netherlands	Vestia	Interest Rate Swaps, Swaptions	2012	Marcel Vries
USD 1 bn	1	USD 1 bn	252.5%	USD 2.52 bn	United States	Hunt Brothers	Silver	1980	William Hunt, Nelson Hunt
BRL 4.62 bn	1.833	USD 2.52 bn	−3.7%	USD 2.43 bn	Brazil	Aracruz	FX Options	2008	Isac Zagury, Rafael Sotero
USD 2.4 bn				USD 2.4 bn	United States	SemGroup	Oil Futures	2008	
USD 1.7 bn	1	USD 1.7 bn	39.9%	USD 2.38 bn	United States	Orange County	Leveraged bond investments	1994	Robert Citron
DEM 2.63 bn	1.655	USD 1.59 bn	43.5%	USD 2.28 bn	Germany	Metallgesellschaft	Oil Futures	1993	Heinz Schimmelbusch
JPY 166 bn	111.08	USD 1.49 bn	43.5%	USD 2.14 bn	Japan	Showa Shell Sekiyu	FX Forwards	1993	
JPY 153.6 bn	102.18	USD 1.50 bn	39.9%	USD 2.09 bn	Japan	Kashima Oil	FX Forwards	1994	
USD 2 bn				USD 2 bn	United States	Soros Fund Management	Russian Equities	1998	
USD 2 bn				USD 2 bn	United States	Tiger Management	Shorting Japanese yen	1998	
USD 2 bn	1	USD 2 bn	−8.5%	USD 1.83 bn	United Kingdom	UBS	Equities ETF and Delta 1	2011	Kweku Adoboli
HKD 14.7 bn	7.786	USD 1.89 bn	−3.7%	USD 1.82 bn	China	CITIC Pacific	Foreign Exchange Trading	2008	Frances Yung
GBP 827 mn	0.633	USD 1.31 bn	36.1%	USD 1.78 bn	Singapore	Barings Bank	Nikkei Futures	1995	Nick Leeson
RUB 78.5 bn	38.98	USD 2.01 bn	−12.6%	USD 1.76 bn	Russia	Transneft	Derivatives	2014	Maksim Grishanin, VP Finance
USD 1.8 bn	1	USD 1.8 bn	−3.7%	USD 1.74 bn	United States	Deutsche Bank	Derivatives	2008	Boaz Weinstein
USD 1.6 bn				USD 1.6 bn	United States	Icahn Enterprises	Hertz	2020	Carl Icahn
JPY 130 bn				USD 1.6 bn	Japan	AIJ Investment Advisors	Volatility options	2012	Kazuhiko Asakawa
USD 1.75 (EUR 1.4) bn	0.923	USD 1.29 bn	20.4%	USD 1.56 bn	Austria	BAWAG	Foreign Exchange Trading	2000	Wolfgang Flöttl, Helmut Elsner
USD 1.1 bn	1	USD 1.10 bn	36.1%	USD 1.50 bn	Japan	Daiwa Bank	Bonds	1995	Toshihide Iguchi
USD 1.5 bn	1	USD 1.5 bn			United States	Berkshire Hathaway	Paramount Global	2023	Warren Buffett
USD 0.80 bn	1	USD 0.80 bn	82.5%	USD 1.46 bn	United Kingdom	Soros Fund	SP 500 Futures	1987	George Soros
CAD 2.1 bn	1.406	USD 1.5 bn	-20%	USD 1.19 bn	🇨🇦 Canada	Alberta Investment Management Corporation	Volatility Selling	2020	Peter Pontikes & David Triska
USD 0.94 (EUR 0.75) bn	0.679	USD 1.10 bn	−3.7%	USD 1.06 bn	France	Groupe Caisse d'Epargne	Derivatives	2008	Boris Picano-Nacci
BRL 2 bn	1.833	USD 1.09 bn	−3.7%	USD 1.05 bn	Brazil	Sadia	FX and Credit Options	2008	Adriano Ferreira, Álvaro Ballejo
EUR 0.730 bn		USD 1 bn≈		USD 1 bn≈	Italy	Monte dei Paschi di Siena	Synthetic CDOs; Credit Default Swaps on Italian government bonds Equity swaps on Intesa Sanpaolo shares	2005-2009	
USD 1 bn					Saudi Arabia	Saudi National Bank	Credit Suisse	2023	
GBP 0.4 bn	0.611	USD 0.66 bn	29.2%	USD 0.85 bn	United Kingdom	Morgan Grenfell	Shares	1997	Peter Young
USD 0.6 bn	1	USD 0.60 bn	39.9%	USD 0.84 bn	United States	Askin Capital Management	Mortgage-Backed Securities	1994	David Askin
USD 0.75 (EUR 0.60) bn	1.371	USD 0.82 bn	0.0	USD 0.82 bn	Germany	WestLB	Common and Preferred Shares	2007	Friedhelm Breuers
USD 0.69 bn	1	USD 0.69 bn	15.3%	USD 0.80 bn	United States	AIB/Allfirst	Foreign Exchange Options	2002	John Rusnak
S$1.13 bn				USD 0.80 bn	Singapore	Hin Leong Trading	Oil	2020	
DEM 0.47 bn	2.587	USD 0.18 bn	320.6%	USD 0.76 bn	Germany	Herstatt Bank	Foreign Exchange Trading	1974	Dany Dattel
USD 0.77 bn				USD 0.77 bn	United States	Arkansas Teacher Retirement System	volatility-trading fund	2020	
		USD 0.68 bn	0%	USD 0.68 bn	China	Unipec	Oil	2018	
				USD 0.65 bn	United States	Quantum Fund	Japanese Yen Shorting	1994	Stanley Druckenmiller
CAD 0.68 bn	1.066	USD 0.64 bn	0%	USD 0.64 bn	Canada	Bank of Montreal	Natural gas derivatives	2007	David Lee, Kevin Cassidy
				USD 0.6 bn	United States	Quantum Fund	Short IT stocks during the internet bubble	1999	Stanley Druckenmiller
USD 0.55 bn	1	USD 0.55 bn	9.8%	USD 0.60 bn	China	China Aviation Oil (Singapore)	Oil Futures and Options	2004	Chen Jiulin
				USD 0.57 bn	China	COSCO Shipping	Freight derivatives	2008	
CHF 0.63 bn	1.451	USD 0.43 bn	27.2%	USD 0.55 bn	Switzerland	Union Bank of Switzerland	Equity Derivatives	1998	Ramy Goldstein
USD 0.52 bn				USD 0.52 bn	United States	State Teachers Retirement System of Ohio	Panda Power Funds	2011-2021	
EUR 0.48 bn	1.08	USD 0.519 bn		USD 0.35 bn	France	Électricité de France S.A.	French electricity contracts	2021	
USD 0.44 bn	1	USD 0.44 bn	82.5%	USD 0.44 bn	United States	Knight Capital Group	Equities	2012	Thomas Joyce
USD 0.28 bn	1	USD 0.28 bn	82.5%	USD 0.51 bn	United States	Merrill Lynch	Mortgages (IOs and POs) Trading	1987	Howard A. Rubin
USD 0.28 bn	1	USD 0.28 bn	82.5%	USD 0.51 bn	United States	State of West Virginia	Fixed Income and Interest Rate Derivatives	1987	A. James Manchin
USD 0.35 bn	1	USD 0.35 bn	39.9%	USD 0.49 bn	United States	Kidder Peabody	Government Bonds	1994	Joseph Jett
USD 0.4 bn	1	USD 0.40 bn	20.4%	USD 0.48 bn	United States	Manhattan Investment Fund	Short IT stocks during the internet bubble	2000	Michael Berger
USD 0.37 (EUR 0.30) bn	1.244	USD 0.37 bn	9.8%	USD 0.41 bn	Austria	Hypo Alpe-Adria-Bank International	Foreign Exchange Trading	2004	
	1			USD 0.4 bn	United States	Pershing Square	Netflix	2022	Bill Ackman
USD 0.35 bn	1	USD 0.35 bn	0.0%	USD 0.35 bn	United States	Calyon	Credit Derivatives	2007	Richard "Chip" Bierbaum
USD 0.36 bn	1	USD 0.36 bn	0.0%	USD 0.36 bn	Singapore	Petro-Diamond Singapore	Oil derivatives	2019	Wang Xingchen, Jack
AUD 0.36 bn	1.171	USD 0.31 bn	9.8%	USD 0.34 bn	Australia	National Australia Bank	Foreign Exchange Trading	2004	Luke Duffy, Gianni Gray, Vince Ficarra & David Bullen
JPY 28.6 bn				USD 0.34 bn	Japan	Tateho Chemical Industries	Bond futures	1987	
JPY 32 bn				USD 0.34 bn	Japan	Tokyo Securities	Bond futures	1994	
USD 0.3 bn					Qatar	Qatar Investment Authority	Credit Suisse	2023	
USD 0.078 bn	1	USD 0.078 bn	320.4%	USD 0.328 bn	Switzerland	Lloyds Bank	Foreign Exchange Trading	1974	Marc Colombo
CAD 0.36 bn				USD 0.32 bn	Canada	Christopher DeVocht	Stocks	2022	
USD 0.37 (EUR 0.30) bn	0.895	USD 0.27 bn	17.1%	USD 0.31 bn	Belgium	Dexia Bank	Corporate Bonds	2001	
USD 0.296 bn (EUR 0.26) bn	1.11	USD 0.296 bn	-1%	USD 0.296 bn	Hong Kong	Natixis	Equities Derivatives	2018	
USD 0.25 bn+	1	USD 0.25 bn+			United States	Parplus Partners	CBOE Volatility Index futures and options	2020	Jim Carney
USD 0.225 bn	1	USD 0.225 bn	43.5%	USD 0.30 bn	United States	FXCM	Foreign exchange	2015	
USD 0.207 bn	1	USD 0.207 bn	43.5%	USD 0.30 bn	Chile	Codelco	Copper, silver, gold futures	1993	Juan Pablo Davila
EUR 0.160	1.1	USD 0.176 bn	0%	USD 0.176bn	Germany	BNP Paribas Arbitrage	Structured products	2016	Armin S.
JPY 11.5 bn				USD 0.28 bn	Japan/United States	Fuji Bank New York Branch	Foreign exchange trading	1984	
				USD 0.28 bn	United Kingdom	Allied-Lyons	FX derivatives	1991	
USD 0.28 bn	1	USD 0.28 bn			United States	Raytheon Technologies Corporation	volatility-trading fund	2020	
JPY 9.7 bn				USD 0.24 bn	Japan/Singapore	Dai-Ichi Kangyo Bank Singapore Branch	Foreign exchange trading	1982	Haruo Kanda
JPY 22.9 bn				USD 0.23 bn	Japan	Nanzan Gakuen	Equity derivatives	2008	
USD 0.16 bn	1	USD 0.16 bn	39.9%	USD 0.22 bn	United States	Procter & Gamble	Interest rate derivatives	1994	Raymond Mains
USD 0.04 bn	1	USD 0.04 bn	433.8%	USD 0.214 bn	Switzerland	United California Bank of Basel	Cocoa futures	1970	Paul Erdman
USD 0.2 bn	1	USD 0.20 bn	6.2%	USD 0.21 bn	China	State Reserves Bureau Copper Scandal	Copper Futures	2005	Liu Qibing
HKD 1.38 bn				USD 0.17 bn	Hong Kong	Chinese Estates	Evergrande	2021	
GBP 0.09 bn	0.611	USD 0.15 bn	29.2%	USD 0.19 bn	United Kingdom	NatWest	Interest Rate Options	1997	Kyriacos Papouis
USD 0.039 bn	1	USD 0.039 bn	320.4%	USD 0.164 bn	United States	Franklin National Bank	Foreign Exchange Trading	1974	Peter Shaddick
USD 0.11 bn	1	USD 0.11 bn	39.9%	USD 0.15 bn	United States	Cuyahoga County, Ohio	Leveraged Fixed Income	1994	
JPY 15.4 bn				USD 0.15 bn	Japan	Komazawa Gakuen	Currency Derivatives	2008	
SEK 1.23 bn	7.804	USD 0.15 bn	−4.8%	USD 0.143 bn	Sweden	HQ Bank	Equity Derivatives	2010	Fredrik Crafoord, Mikael König, Patrik Enblad
USD 0.15 bn				USD 0.15 bn	United States	OptionSellers.com	commodity trading	2018	James S. Cordier
USD 0.15 bn					United Kingdom	Softbank Vision Fund	Paytm	2024	
JPY 13.9 bn				USD 0.14 bn	Japan	Nippon Steel Chemical	Bond futures	1993	
USD 0.14 bn	1	USD 0.14 bn	−3.7%	USD 0.13 bn	United States	MF Global	Wheat Futures	2008	Evan Dooley
			N/A	USD 0.13 bn	Japan	Self-Portfolio	Bitcoin	2017-2018	Masayoshi Son
USD 0.120 bn	1	USD 0.12 bn	−3,7%	USD 0.12 bn	United States	Morgan Stanley	Credit-index options	2008	Matt Piper
USD 0.12 (EUR 0.1) bn	1	USD 0.12 bn	−1%	USD 0.12 bn	Norway	Einar Aas	Nordpool Power Derivatives	2018	Einar Aas
JPY 11.9 bn				USD 0.12 bn	Japan	Nippon Sanso	Interest rate swap	1995	
USD 0.1 bn	1	USD 0.10 bn	15.3%	USD 0.12 bn	Croatia	Riječka Banka	Foreign Exchange Trading	2002	Eduard Nodilo
HKD 1 bn				USD 0.12 bn	Hong Kong	Blue River Holdings	Evergrande Vehicle	2021	
USD 0.11 bn					United States	Berkshire Hathaway	Paytm	2023	
USD 0.1 bn	1	usd 0.12 bn	1.2 %	0.14 bn	United Kingdom	Balyasny London	Event-driven investing	2023	George Klavdianos

== See also ==
- Rogue trader
- Financial risk management § Investment management
- Derivative (finance)
- Silver Thursday
- Sumitomo copper affair
- R/wallstreetbets
