= Operational due diligence (alternative investments) =

Investigation of operational risks

In alternative investments, operational due diligence (ODD), is an investigation (due diligence) into operational factors of alternative investment entities such as a hedge fund, private equity fund, or infrastructure fund.

ODD has gained prominence over the past years due to the failure of hedge funds such as Amaranth Advisors and the Bayou Hedge Fund Group. Also contributing to the increase of interest in this field were the actions of alleged rogue traders such as Brian Hunter and alleged Ponzi schemers such as Arthur Nadel, Jérôme Kerviel and Bernard Madoff.

Operational risks are the risks arising from execution of the business functions of any entity, for example an alternative investment fund, and these are distinct from its investment functions.

An ODD exercise does not include within its scope the investment functions of an alternative investment fund and therefore generally does not include the gathering, analysis and verification of information relating to the historic actual or future expected investment performance of such funds, the variance or future expected variance of the returns of such funds, or the appropriateness of the stated strategy of such funds as a (potential) constituent part of the investor's wider portfolio, except insofar as these investment functions are or could themselves be adversely influenced by operational risks.

However, a separate “Investment Due Diligence” (IDD) exercise is often carried out by or on behalf of (potential) investors to consider investment functions. In fact, historically, it can be said that it has been more common for an IDD to be performed than for an ODD to be performed, despite strong academic arguments and empirical evidence that overall risk (i.e., investment risk and operational risk) is best capable of being understood and mitigated where both an IDD and an ODD are performed.

== Importance ==
The historical position is somewhat odd given the prevalence of operational risk failures in, for example, hedge fund scandals and closures over the years. As early as 2003, a study by Christopher Kundro and Stuart Feffer of Capco indicated that operational risk failings were the sole reason for 50% of all hedge fund failures (with operational risk failings being a contributing factor in other failures as well), rather than bad investment decisions alone (38%), and anecdotal evidence seems to imply that (i) the impact of operational risk is at least as pervasive in other (non-hedge fund) types of alternative investment funds, and (ii) that the impact of operational risk failings has not decreased since the Capco study.

For example, a May 2009 derivative lawsuit relating to a feeder fund invested in a managed account that was exposed to Madoff's split strike conversion strategy noted that “the Madoff story bristled with red flags that a financial professional firm performing an evaluation [ODD] and subsequent management and oversight, in good faith, could not have missed.”

The clear implication of this statement is that in the absence of detailed and robust pre-investment and on-going ODD, investors simply missed the operational risks inherent in the structure.

== Purpose ==
The purpose of an ODD exercise is to gather, analyse and (to a degree) verify information relating to operational risks to:

- allow an investor in a specific alternative investment fund to form a considered view as to whether to remain invested or to divest, or
- allow a potential investor in a specific alternative investment fund to form a considered view as to whether to invest or not, and
- (ideally) identify conditions which the investor or potential investor may seek to negotiate to reduce the overall level of operational risk associated with a new or existing investment in such specific alternative investment fund.

A small sample of the items which may be included within the scope of an ODD is outlined below:

- mark to market valuation techniques, and related processes/controls and disclosures
- business continuity and disaster recovery planning
- fraud risk and other irregularities
- behavioral analysis of individuals (e.g. fund directors and employees/principals of the manager of the alternative investment fund) and outsourced service providers, including their incentivisation
- liquidity mechanisms (“lock-ins” and “gates”)
- security of assets
- legal review, covering (amongst other things) design and establishment of the legal structure, advice taken by the alternative investment fund and its manager, material contracts, investment terms, indemnifications and insurances (although this may be performed as a separate legal due diligence)
- review of the controls and processes employed by the fund through its main outsourced service providers (investment manager, fund administrator, transfer agent, etc.) over the management of fund assets to establish whether these are fit for purpose and being followed
- review of the operating processes and record-keeping supporting tax relating to maintaining beneficial tax treatment or "keeping the fund offshore".

== Comparison to operational risk considerations in the context of banks' prudential capital requirements ==
Much of the literature associated with ODD, particularly the academic literature, is based on an underlying definition of operational risk that was originally designed in the context of the banking industry and contained within the Basel Accords, which holds that operational risk is the risk of loss resulting from inadequate or failed internal processes, people and systems, or from external events.

The banking industry is, in most economies, subject to regulation by a national financial services supervisory body, for example the Financial Services Authority in the UK, with the regulatory regime including a requirement for banks to hold at least minimum levels of capital designed to withstand the likely incidence of various risks, including operational risks. The capital held by banks for the purpose of meeting the requirements of the relevant regulator(s) is referred to as their capital requirement or prudential capital.

The imperative of considering operational risk in the context of banks is to ascertain an amount in currency which, if maintained by the bank as capital, should (in theory at least) fully compensate for the expected impact of crystallization of the operational risks faced by the bank. When this “operational risk requirement” is added to the other elements of a bank's prudential capital requirement (relating to non-operational risks faced by the bank), the resulting total gives the bank's “total capital requirement”.

== The problem with adopting a banking-style approach to ODD ==
Some forms of ODD fit neatly within the banking paradigm as described above, in that they look at a discrete number of operational factors, assign probabilities, co-relations between factors and estimated losses (generally based on extrapolations of historic data) and eventually come up with a single metric (analogous to the “operational risk requirement” of a bank) which is then compared to a pre-set threshold to give a simple binary answer to the invest / don’t invest or remain invested / divest question.

Despite according neatly with the theory, such forms of ODD have severe limitations; for example such forms:

• tend to incentivise “window-dressing” behaviours by the manager of the alternative investment fund (as a checklist-based approach is often employed with the majority of the questions being easily foreseeable by the manager of the alternative investment fund);

• often utilise less-experienced personnel without the experience to ask the right follow up questions or “smell a rat”;

• tend not to react (or not to react quickly enough) to new or developing risks which are industry-wide or to risks that are specific to the alternative investment fund in question or pertinent to the specific investor;

• tend to apply weightings to the risk factors addressed that are static and based on historical data, whereas in reality future likelihood of risk crystallisation and quantum of expected loss on crystallisation are dynamic variables;

• tend to apply correlation factors to separate risks that are static and based on historical data, whereas in reality correlation factors are dynamic variables; and

• tend to give binary results without identifying conditions which the investor or potential investor may seek to put in place (via negotiation with the manager of the alternative investment fund) to reduce the overall level of operational risk associated with a new or existing investment.

== Increased compliance focus during operational due diligence reviews ==
Operational due diligence reviews performed by ODD analysts and investors have increasingly devoted significant portions of the overall reviews towards compliance related matters, which result from increased complexity and volume of global compliance regulations related to alternative investments. It has also been suggested that this trend will continue as changes in established regulations, such as Dodd-Frank, are being considered in the U.S. Investors are increasingly performing operational due diligence reviews on other types of alternative investments, including private equity funds.

== Governance considerations in an operational due diligence context ==
Analyzing considerations related to the concept of hedge fund governance have increasingly been considered by investors during the context of operational due diligence reviews.

For hedge funds, traditional notions of governance in an ODD context have focused around the Board of Directors of offshore (i.e. - non-US) based vehicles often domiciled in places such as the Cayman Islands.

== Recent developments in ODD ==
Madoff Effect and Operational Drag

A 2010 study shows that frauds such as Madoff have created a so-called Madoff Effect by which investors tend to tailor their operational due diligence around recent frauds while minimizing certain other operational risks.

Other recent developments:

Where a more nuanced approach to ODD is taken, the benefits accruing to the recipients of the ODD report generally include:

- a team with the experience to ask the right follow up questions and “smell a rat” and the professional credibility to be able to get the right information out of interviewees, interpret this and bring to bear experience of common and best practice;
- quality advice as to the relative negotiating power of the (potential) investor and the manager of the relevant alternative investment fund;
- detailed recommendations regarding conditions which the investor or potential investor may wish to consider negotiating with the manager of the alternative investment fund to reduce the overall level of operational risk associated with a new or existing investment;
- consideration of new and developing risks which are industry-wide, and risks that are specific to the alternative investment fund in question or pertinent to the specific investor;

== Choosing an ODD provider ==
Investors may perform operational due diligence themselves or they may work with consultants to either outsource operational due diligence reviews entirely, or to complement their own internal efforts. The general consensus is that the forms of ODD which provide greatest benefit for investors are those characterized by:

• not relying on a checklist approach so that the investigation is bespoke for the investor's specific interests and tailored to the target alternative investment fund;

• offering multi-disciplinary solutions to legal, financial and accounting, tax, regulatory and compliance, risk management, corporate governance and internal control concerns (as opposed to skills in one particular area such as accounting);

• the involvement of a team with the breadth and depth of experience to clearly and succinctly identify “red flags” and propose practical recommendations for risk mitigation and monitoring;

• transparency of detailed findings to the end investor – note that managers of funds of alternative investment funds (e.g. fund of hedge funds managers) typically do not provide full transparency to their investors of the findings of their ODD, with investors simply becoming aware, after the fact, that an investment in an “underlying” fund has been made or that a divestment has occurred;

• succinct written responsibilities and scope, as well as clear legal liability of those performing the ODD for the quality of their work;

• individuals and organizations involved in the performance of the ODD being subject to professional requirements on ethics, independence, minimum levels of professional indemnity insurance and Continuing Professional Development of an appropriate professional body or institute, with underlying work performed as part of the ODD subject to oversight and Quality Assurance reviews by that body or institute.

• being paid for directly by the end user (i.e., the investor) rather than by the alternative investment fund or its manager (due to the conflict of interest created if the fund or its manager is the “client”) or bundled as part of a wider service (for example as is the case with a fund of funds).

== See also ==
- Operational risk management
- Operational risk
