= State Reserves Bureau copper scandal =

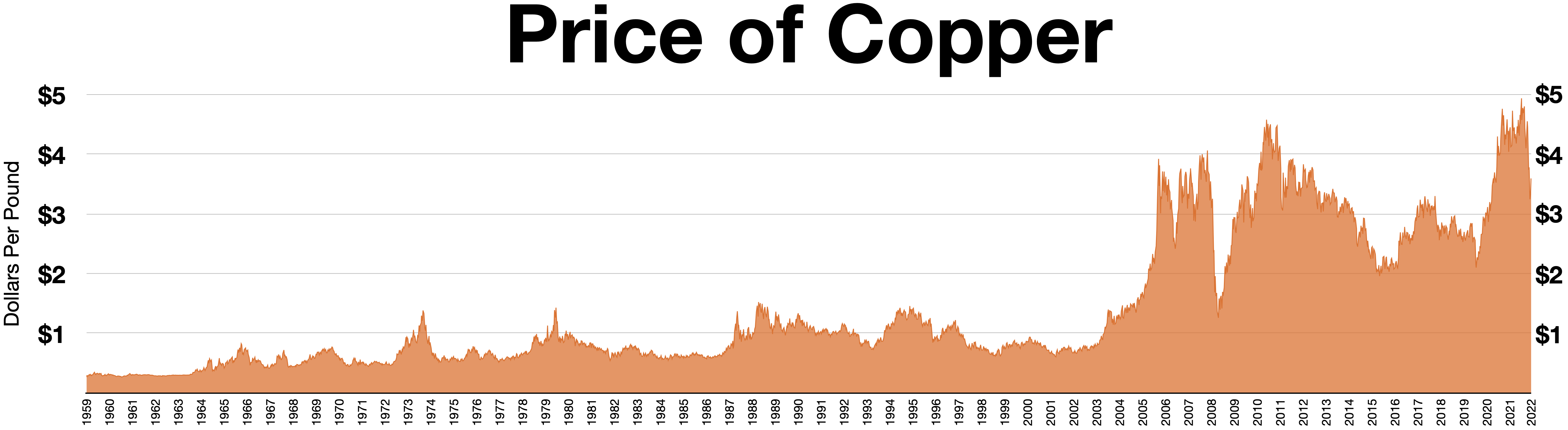
Price of copper 1959-2022

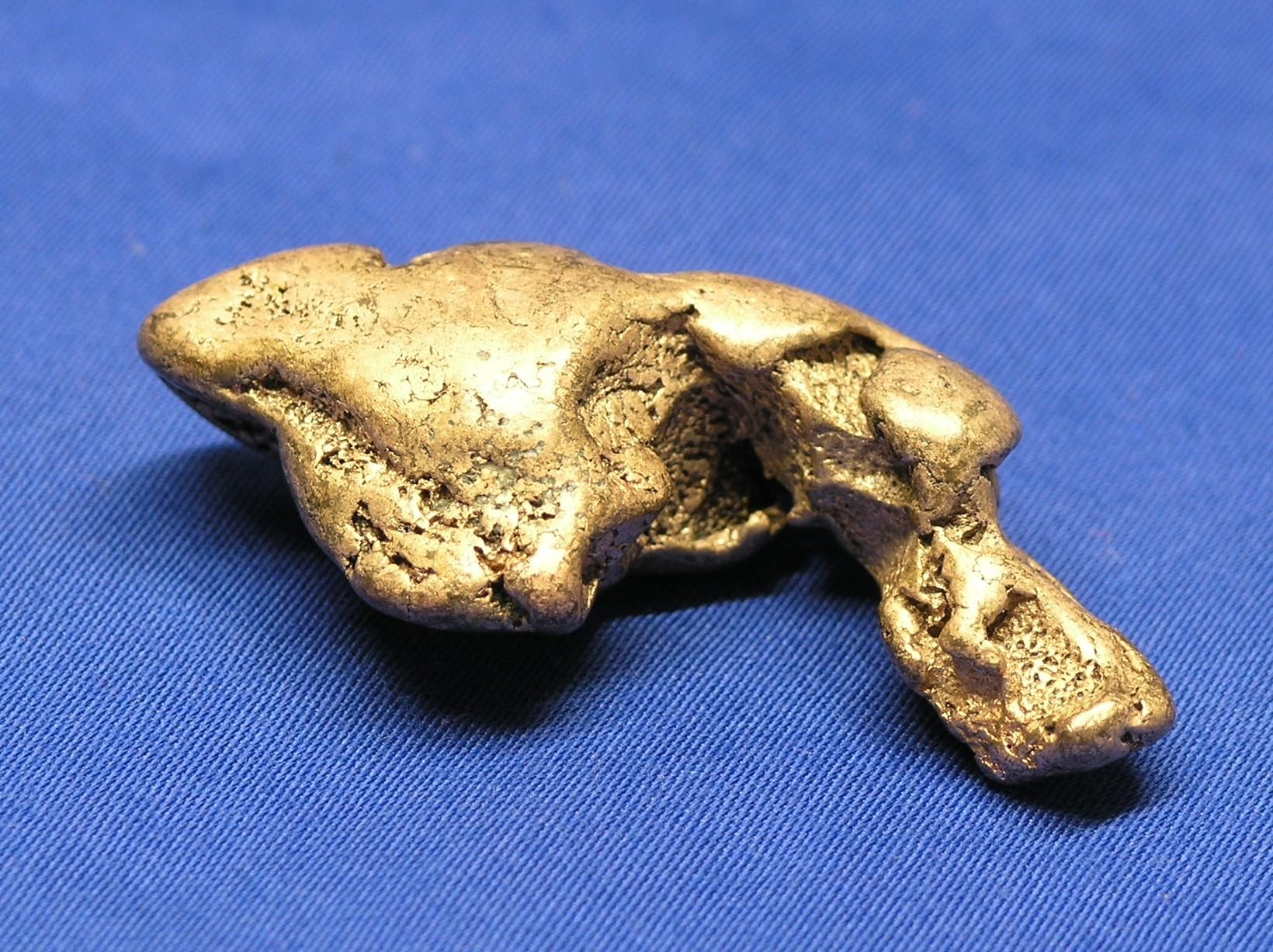
A copper nugget

The State Reserves Bureau copper scandal refers to a loss of approximately US$150 million as a result of trading LME Copper futures contracts at the London Metal Exchange (LME) by rogue trader Liu Qibing, who was the chief trader for the Import and Export Department of the State Regulation Centre for Supply Reserves (SRCSR), the trading agency for the State Reserve Bureau (SRB) of China in 2005.

== Unauthorized trading ==
After obtaining a bachelor in economics, Liu Qibing started working for the SRCSR, and was sent to the LME for training in 1995. Liu became the director of Import and Export Department at SRCSR, in 1999, and was authorized to place orders on LME and the Shanghai Futures Exchange (SHFE). In 2002, Liu was promoted again to be the chief trader of SRCSR. Between 2002 and 2004, Liu had traded long positions on copper to bet that China's construction boom at the time would lead to price increases. Starting around 2003, Liu started to arbitrage copper prices between the SHFE and the LME by holding opposite positions simultaneously on the SHFE and the LME. Liu was typically long copper futures on the SHFE and short LME copper contracts on the LME. Since foreign investors are not allowed to access the SHFE, Liu found disparities between SHFE and LME copper prices that he exploited. Liu's trading activities earned approximately US$300 million for the Chinese government between 2002 and 2004.

=== 2005 trades ===
Liu began shorting copper in the spring of 2005, allegedly because he observed that the SRB will be selling copper on the spot market, and that the Chinese central bank was preventing state banks from lending to real estate developers to prevent inflation, which would reduce demand for copper. These central bank policies proved to be temporary, however, and lending for real estate construction resumed, leading to copper price increases. According to sources published by The Washington Post, as Liu suffered trading losses, his supervisors apparently pressured him to double his bets hoping to recover his losses and avoid reporting those losses to higher authorities. According to China Daily, Liu's position grew to a short 130,000 tonnes of copper in July and August 2005 for delivery in December 2005. By early September, Liu's position grew to a short 220,000 tonnes of copper, with an average price of US$3500 per tonne, due for delivery mostly on December 21 and the rest in 2006. LME traders at the time, who thought they were dealing with the SRB through Liu, apparently did not believe that the SRB had enough copper stocks to execute those contracts, and they bought copper contracts against Liu's position. When copper prices continued rising, Liu Qibing disappeared from public view on November 14, 2005.

=== SRB response ===
Immediately after Liu's disappearance, officials at the SRB denied knowing Liu Qibing and stated that the SRB was not involved in short selling copper. However, other traders at the London Metals Exchange stated that they knew him as China's main metals trader. The confusion stems from the fact that the SRB is a Chinese government entity that acts through the SRCSR, which is a separately registered government-owned nonprofit organization with its own registered capital. Both the SRB and the SRCSR are owned by the National Development and Reform Commission (NDRC) of China, which means that SRCSR is not the subsidiary of SRB, rather that SRCSR is acting as an agent for the SRB. SRCSR can participate in market trading, but the commodities underlying those trading activities belong to the SRB. SRCSR's separate capital pool also implies that exposure to losses by the NDRC is limited by its invested capital. Contrary to Western press reports, Liu Qibing was not an employee at the SRB, but a senior official at the SRCSR, which explains SRB's first denials of the incident.

The SRB eventually acknowledged knowing Liu Qibing, stated that he had been on leave, and later announced that the trader had acted on his own, without authorization. This raised the possibility that the SRB might not settle Liu's positions, and leave LME brokers who executed trades for Liu with losses. The UK Financial Services Authority warned the LME that if the SRB could prove that Liu was not authorized to trade futures, they do not have to honour his trades. The LME stated that the SRE was not a clearing member of the exchange, and that other clearing members were liable for the SRB's positions on the exchange should the SRB default on their positions.

Eventually, the SRB did take ownership of Liu's trades, and tried to manage the loss they incurred rather than immediately close the Liu's positions. The SRB announced copper stockpiles of 1.3 million tonnes that greatly exceeded market estimates of SRB stock at the time, which were about 250,000 tonnes. On November 16, 2005 and November 23, 2005, the SRB auctioned 20,000 tonnes of copper, and auctioned more copper on November 30, 2005. These actions led to copper price declines during this period, but LME traders ultimately did not believe SRB's new stockpile data and drove prices even higher; LME copper prices increased from $4100 before the first SRB auction to $4400 after the fourth SRB auction. On December 21, LME copper warehouse stocks in Korea increased by around 50,000 tonnes, most of which were sent from China. Consensus among LME traders then was that these additional stocks were sent by the SRB to settle part of Liu's positions, at a realized loss of an estimated US$45 million, while the rest of those short positions had been extended to 2006 and 2007.

== Lax controls ==
The incident highlights the lax trading controls of Chinese government entities at the time. Between 2002 and 2004, Liu made US$300 million for the Chinese government speculating on copper prices, even though the SRCSR had no mandate to speculate for profit. By June 2004, Liu Qibing was the only authorized trader in SRCSR's futures and forwards trading group down from an originally larger group of traders, and this situation persisted for more than a year until the trading incident. The lack of personnel implied a lack of human resources for internal controls at the SRCSR. The SRB denial of knowing Liu Qibing implies that the organization was unaware of activities at the SRCSR and the state of its trading group. Additionally, the Chinese derivatives supervisor, the China Securities Regulatory Commission (CSRC), did not supervise the derivatives trading of other government agencies such as the SRB. The lack of controls at the SRB, the SRCSR, and at the CSRC over Liu Qibing's trading activities allowed him to build his large trading position.

== Aftermath ==
In March 2008, Liu Qibing and his supervisor both went on trial in China, accused of breaking various regulations. Liu Qibing was sentenced to seven years in prison.

== See also ==
- Sumitomo copper affair
- Silver Thursday
- List of trading losses
