= Brian Hunter =

Brian Hunter may refer to:

- Brian Hunter (outfielder) (born 1971), American baseball outfielder who played in the 1990s
- Brian Hunter (first baseman) (born 1968), American baseball infielder who played in the 1990s
- Brian Hunter (trader) (born 1974), Canadian natural gas trader associated with Amaranth Advisors and Solengo Capital
- Brian Hunter (pole vaulter), winner of the 2002 NCAA DI outdoor pole vault championship
