= Copper manipulation =

Copper manipulation may refer to:

- List of copper alloys
- Sumitomo copper affair in the mid-1990s
- United Copper affair in 1907
