= Lücheng railway station =

Railway station in Jiangsu, China

Coordinates: 31.907054°N 119.742035°E

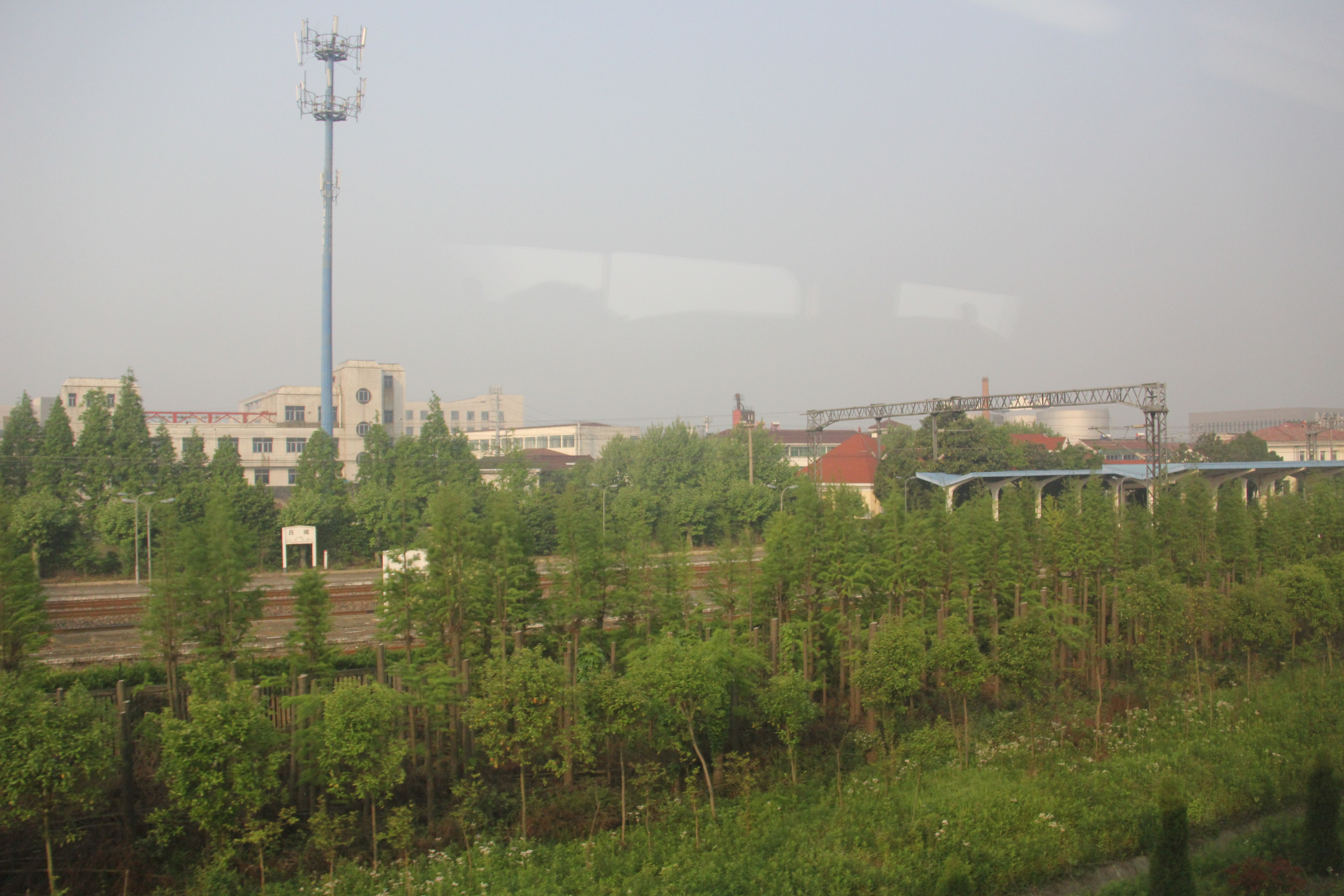
Lyucheng Railway Station in Beijing

Lücheng Railway Station is a railway station of Beijing–Shanghai railway located in Jiangsu, People's Republic of China, currently there's only freight services. It serves military supplies, oil and chemical stuffs transports for PLA East Sea Fleet and China National Aviation Fuel via tracks to Changzhou Benniu Airport.

It's also a reserved station of Shanghai–Nanjing intercity railway, but until May 2019 there's no further informations that when construction can be started.
