= Leopold Aschenbrenner =

German AI researcher and asset manager (born 2001/2002)

- Born: 2001 or 2002 (age 24–25); Germany
- Education: Columbia University (BA)
- Occupations: AI researcher Investor
- Employer: OpenAI (2023–2024)
- Notable work: Situational Awareness
- Spouse: Avital Balwit (m. 2026)
- Website: https://www.forourposterity.com/

Leopold Aschenbrenner (born 2001/2002) is a German artificial intelligence researcher and investor. He was part of OpenAI's "Superalignment" team before he was fired in April 2024 over an alleged information leak, which Aschenbrenner disputes. In 2024, he published an essay titled "Situational Awareness" about the emergence of artificial general intelligence (AGI) and related security risks. The essay attracted widespread media and industry attention, and became the namesake for Aschenbrenner's hedge fund, Situational Awareness LP. The hedge fund, which had $45 billion AUM at its peak, invests in private and public companies involved in AI.

== Early life ==
Aschenbrenner was born in Germany to parents who were doctors, and was educated at the John F. Kennedy School in Berlin. In 2021, at the age of 19, Aschenbrenner graduated from Columbia University as valedictorian with a B.A. in economics and mathematics-statistics. While at Columbia, he co-founded the university's effective altruism (EA) chapter.

While at Columbia, Aschenbrenner contributed to research at Columbia's economics and political science departments, at the Future of Humanity Institute at the University of Oxford, and at the Global Priorities Institute at Oxford.

== Career ==
=== FTX ===
Aschenbrenner joined the FTX Future Fund team in February 2022. The team was part of the FTX Foundation, the philanthropic arm of crypto exchange FTX, and provided grant funding for research topics that would "improve humanity's long-term prospects". Aschenbrenner resigned alongside other team members on 11 November 2022, the same day that FTX filed for bankruptcy.

=== OpenAI ===
Aschenbrenner joined OpenAI in 2023, on a team called "Superalignment", headed by Jan Leike and Ilya Sutskever. The team pursued technical breakthroughs to steer and control AI systems smarter than humans. As a member of the team, Aschenbrenner co-authored "Weak to Strong Generalization", which was presented at the 2024 International Conference on Machine Learning.

In April 2023, a hacker gained access to OpenAI's internal messaging system and stole information, an event that OpenAI kept private. Subsequently, Aschenbrenner wrote a memo to OpenAI's board of directors about the possibility of industrial espionage by Chinese and other foreign entities, arguing that OpenAI's security was insufficient. According to Aschenbrenner, this memo led to tensions between the board and the leadership about security, and he received a warning from human resources. OpenAI later fired him in April 2024 over an alleged information leak, which Aschenbrenner said was about a benign brainstorming document shared to three external researchers for feedback. OpenAI stated that the firing was unrelated to the security memo, whereas Aschenbrenner said that it was made explicit to him at the time that it was a major reason.

The Superalignment team was dissolved one month later, with the departure from OpenAI of other researchers including Jan Leike and Ilya Sutskever.

=== Situational Awareness essay ===
Shortly after his departure from OpenAI, Aschenbrenner wrote a 165-page essay titled "Situational Awareness: The Decade Ahead", published in June 2024. It predicts the emergence of AGI, imagines a path from AGI to superintelligence, describes four risks to humanity, outlines a way for humans to deal with superintelligent machines, and articulates the principles of an "AGI realism". He specifically warns that the United States needs to defend against the use of AI technologies by countries such as Russia and China. Aschenbrenner argues that by 2027 AI systems will have the capacity to conduct their own AI research. Hundreds of millions of AGIs could then automate AI research, compressing a decade of algorithmic progress into less than a year, which would lead to "runaway superintelligence".

Aschenbrenner's essay received widespread coverage from mainstream media, science publications, and advocacy groups.

=== Situational Awareness hedge fund ===
After publishing "Situational Awareness" in 2024, Aschenbrenner founded Situational Awareness LP, a hedge fund backed by Patrick and John Collison, Daniel Gross, and Nat Friedman. Named after his essay "Situational Awareness", the AI-focused investment firm managed about $45 billion at its peak in July 2026.

Aschenbrenner's investment firm suffered $35 billion in losses in July 2026, due to its use of leverage and sharp declines in AI infrastructure investments, while soliciting new funds from investors to cover losses. The Wall Street Journal and CNBC reported that the Situational Awareness fund was forced to sell all of its publicly traded stocks (approximately 80% of which were primarily purchased by Kenneth C. Griffin's Citadel LLC), although it still held a number of private investments. The fund continued to make private investments in the aftermath.

== Personal life ==
Aschenbrenner is married to Avital Balwit. Balwit was a fellow researcher at the Future of Humanity Institute and later joined Aschenbrenner as a member of FTX's Future Fund team. They resigned from FTX on the same day. Balwit later became the chief of staff to the CEO of Anthropic. The couple married in August 2026 in Carmel-by-the-Sea, California.

As of 2026, Aschenbrenner lives in the Nob Hill neighborhood of San Francisco.

== See also ==
List of trading losses
