= John F. Kennedy School, Berlin =

John F. Kennedy School

Location
- Teltower Damm 87–93; Berlin-Zehlendorf; 14167; Germany; 52.425877°N 13.262709°E

Information
- Type: K-12
- Established: 1960
- School number: 06K01
- Principal: Robert Bartz (German HS Principal); Erin Hale (Managing Principal, American HS Principal); Klara Senkel (German ES Principal, acting); Dr. Shana Kennedy-Salchow (American ES Principal)
- Faculty: 174
- Enrollment: approx. 1600
- Website: http://www.jfks.de

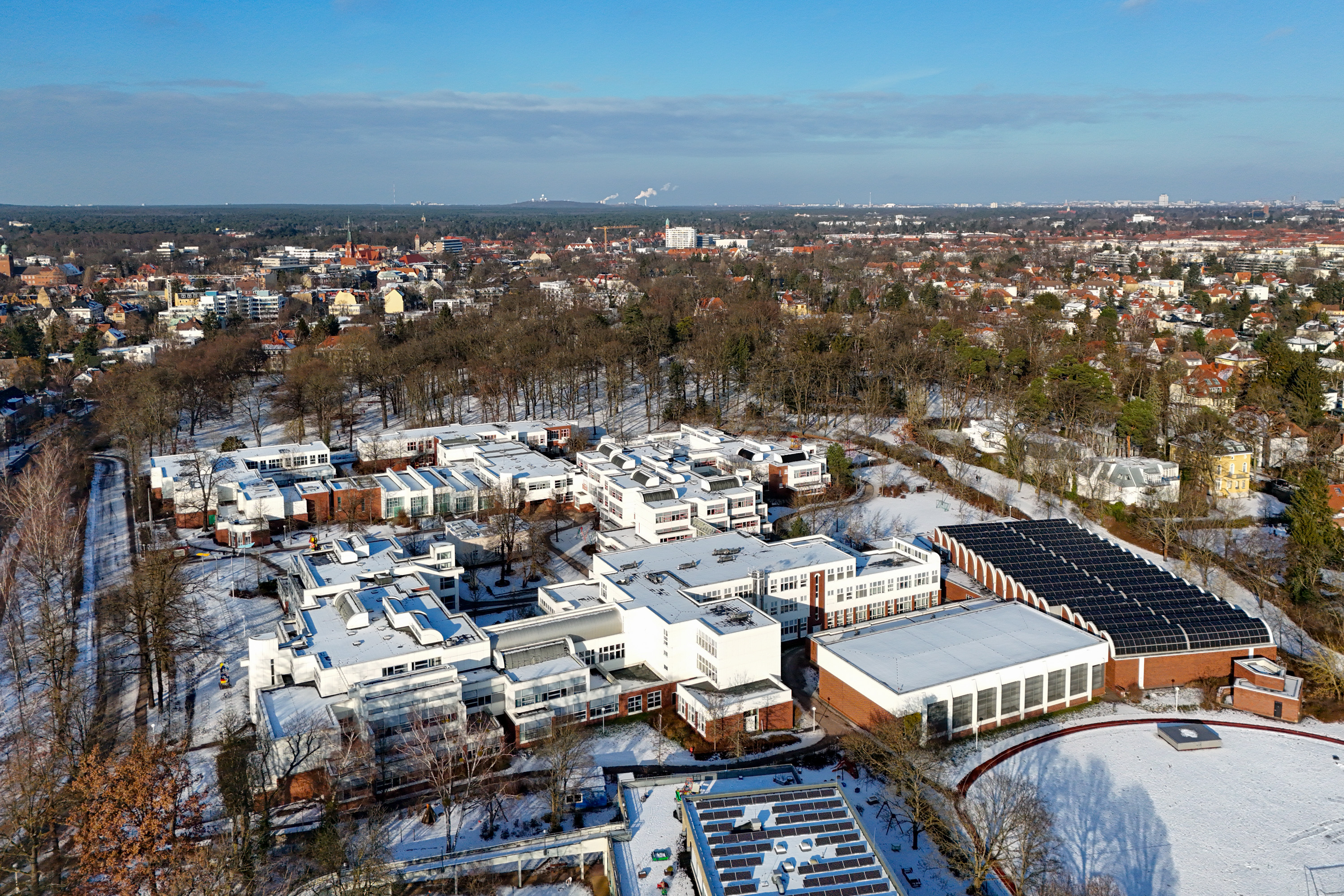
An aerial view of the John F. Kennedy School in Berlin in winter 2024

The John F. Kennedy School (German: John-F.-Kennedy-Schule) is a primary and secondary school in Berlin, Germany offering integrated, bilingual education for both German and American children.

== History ==
The school was originally established in 1960 by the U.S. Military Government along with local Berlin authorities and parents. It was initially called "Deutsch-Amerikanische Gemeinschaftsschule / German-American Community School" to provide elementary school facilities (high school came later) and to foster cultural exchange between young natives of West Berlin and children from U.S. Armed Forces families. The school was renamed in 1963 after the assassination of United States President John F. Kennedy. Most of the present buildings were built in the late 1960s with some additions in the 1990s. After Germany's reunification in 1990 and the withdrawal of the Allied Forces, the mission of the school was redefined. Originally the focus was primarily on reconciliation after the Second World War; today, the school is a model for bilingual schools in Europe.

The school caters primarily to United States Embassy staff, and dependents are entitled to guaranteed admission. Other non-German and German nationals are accepted according to available capacity, their academic qualifications and proof of English Language skills. The John-F.-Kennedy-School is a non-fee paying, bilingual Elementary and High School, governed by a special Act of the Berlin Parliament, stipulating the administrative division of responsibility between a U.S. Principal (appointed by the U.S. Embassy) and a German Director (appointed by the Berlin Senate). Subsequent changes in the Act indicate the intention to further integrate the administration of the School within the German educational system. Attempts by the Berlin Senate to fully integrate the School were postponed in 2017 after parents' protests. The School Conference and the U.S. Embassy finally agreed to the full transfer when demands for added funding (€15 M) for school repairs and increased security expenses were promised.

== Grades offered ==
The John F. Kennedy School includes all grades from kindergarten through 12th grade. Students can choose to graduate after grade 12 with the American high school diploma as well as the German Abitur.

== Campus ==
The school has a modern campus with 135 classrooms, 9 science labs, 3 computer labs, 2 library centers, two gymnasiums, and a fine arts annex, spread out in and around its 6 main buildings. Situated in the locality of Zehlendorf in Southwestern Berlin, the school is conveniently close to bus routes, the S-Bahn, parks, and a district shopping area.

== Students and faculty ==
Most of the approximately 1600 students are German and American citizens. The John F. Kennedy school employs 142 full-time faculty members and 32 part-time faculty members. The school's staff, like the student body, is made up of Americans and Germans.

== Famous alumni ==
- Leopold Aschenbrenner - Hedge fund manager
- Max Kepler - Arizona Diamondbacks Outfielder
- John Brooks - Soccer player for Hertha BSC and the US Men's National Team

== See also ==
- List of memorials to John F. Kennedy
