= Verition Fund Management =

Connecticut Hedge Fund

Verition Fund Management LLC
- Company type: Private
- Industry: Investment management
- Founded: October 2008; 17 years ago
- Founders: Nicholas Maounis; Josh Goldstein
- Headquarters: Greenwich, Connecticut, U.S.
- Key people: Nicholas Maounis (CEO)
- AUM: US$12.6 billion (April 2025)
- Number of employees: 450 (March 2025)
- Website: verition.com

Verition Fund Management (Verition) is an American multi-strategy hedge fund management firm headquartered in Greenwich, Connecticut. It has additional offices in Europe and Asia.

It was founded by Nicholas Maounis after his previous firm Amaranth Advisors went bankrupt.

== Background ==
After the collapse of Amaranth Advisors, its founder Nicholas Maounis worked on founding a new firm to initially manage his wealth. In October 2008, Maounis and Josh Goldstein, the Chief Operating Officer of Maounis' family office founded Verition and initially it had $185 million with 19 employees. The name Verition is derived from Veritas, the Latin word for truth. Maonius hired several ex-Amaranth employees and by 2010, three of Amaranth's four partners were working at Verition. To prevent a repeat of Amaranth, Verition added risk controls and hired risk management specialists to monitor trading risks daily.

For years investors were wary so Verition’s assets were relatively stable and small. In early 2020 as the COVID-19 pandemic began, Verition made money while peers suffered, and it started getting more inflows.

In September 2021, Verition reopened the fund to investors but increased the lockup period from one year to three years. At that time according to Bloomberg News, Verition since inception never had an annual loss and in 2020 had a return of 30.4% which was higher than the 9.5% average among hedge funds. In the same month Verition started expanding its presence in Asia by opening offices in Hong Kong and Singapore.

Verition trades similar strategies to its peers but finds more esoteric bets within them, such as financial transmission rights. In addition it has a higher ratio of Portfolio managers to capital which would lead to more smaller bets rather than a few concentrated large bets.

As of March 2025, Verition has an average annual return of about 12.9% since launch.

In April 2025, Affiliated Managers Group acquired a minority interest in Verition.

== Controversies ==
=== Valuation expert lawsuit ===
Verition was a sizable owner of AOL stock in 2015 when it was acquired by Verizon for $4.4 billion, or $50 per share. Verition questioned the price in the Delaware Court of Chancery arguing AOL had sold itself too cheaply and thus had deprived shareholders of a bigger payoff. Finance experts were hired by Verizon and Verition to evaluate AOL's price with Verizon and Verition aiming for the lower and higher ones respectively. Verizon hired Daniel Fischel of Compass Lexecon who came up with a share price of $44.85 while Verition hired Bradford Cornell of Coherent Economics who came up with a share price of $68.98.

In 2018, Judge Sam Glasscock III ruled in favour of Verizon with intermediate value of $48.70, which was later reduced to $47.08. This was a blow to Verition, which calculated its loss at $25.2 million. Glasscock stated in his ruling that he questioned Cornell's impartiality and tossed out his estimate.

It was revealed that Cornell, who was previously with Compass Lexecon, intended to represent Verizon initially but was passed over for Fischel. He later left to join Coherent Economics and would represent Verition. In an email to Fischel, Cornell stated Verition had a lousy case. The conflict of interest was not disclosed to Verition beforehand.

In December 2018 Verition sent a letter threatening legal action against Cornell and Coherent Economics for damages stating it was "fraudulently induced" to enter into the contract with Coherent and demanded the full $35.7 million it says it lost (including interest). However, before Verition could sue, Cornell and Coherent Economics launched lawsuits against Verition first with Verition launching its own lawsuit to dismiss them. The courts ruled in favour of Verition to dismiss the lawsuits.

=== Employee lawsuit ===
In April 2023, Jump Trading pursued legal action to prevent one of its former traders from joining Verition citing he had trade secrets related to algorithmic trading. The trader who had left Jump Trading in March 2022 was under a non-compete clause to not work in the field until April 2024.

After failing to block the trader twice, Jump Trading reached a settlement with Verition in November 2023.
