= China National Aviation Fuel =

Chinese state-owned enterprise

China National Aviation Fuel Group
- China National Aviation Fuel logo (left) and Chinese text "China Aviation Fuel" (中国航油)

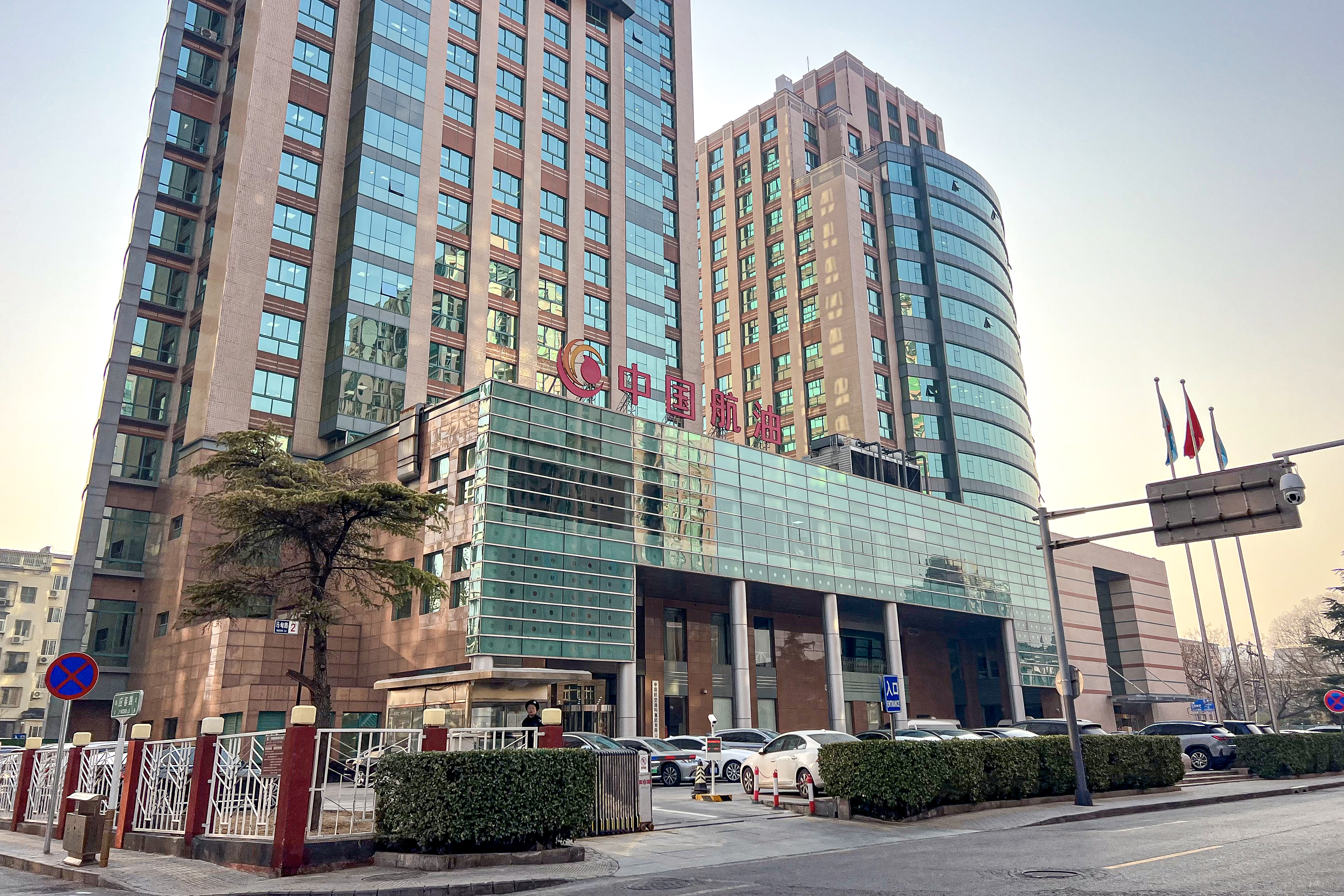
- Headquarters
- Company type: State-owned enterprise
- Industry: Oil and gas industry, equity investment
- Headquarters: CNAF Plaza, Beijing, China
- Products: Jet fuel
- Revenue: ▼CN¥225.831 billion (2013)
- Operating income: ▲CN¥3.151 billion (2013)
- Net income: ▲CN¥939 million (2013)
- Total assets: ▼CN¥38.969 billion (2013)
- Total equity: ▲CN¥9.402 billion (2013)
- Owner: Chinese Central Government (100%)
Subsidiaries
China National Aviation Fuel Supply	(51.00%)
China Aviation Oil	(50.88%)
- Website: cnaf.com
- Footnotes / references in consolidated financial statement

China National Aviation Fuel Group Corporation
- Simplified Chinese: 中国航空油料集团公司
- Traditional Chinese: 中國航空油料集團公司
Transcriptions

Alternative Chinese name
- Simplified Chinese: 中国航油
- Traditional Chinese: 中國航油
Transcriptions

China National Aviation Fuel Group Corporation (CNAF) is a Chinese state-owned enterprise. The company owns a 51% stake in China National Aviation Fuel Supply Co., Ltd. (Chinese: 中国航空油料有限责任公司), one of the largest jet fuel suppliers in China. China National Aviation Fuel Group was ranked 484th in 2016 Fortune Global 500 list.

== History ==
China National Aviation Fuel Group (Chinese: 中国航空油料集团) obtained its current name on 11 October 2002. In 2005 a subsidiary with limited liabilities was incorporated under the Companies Law of China on 22 September 2005, as China National Aviation Fuel Supply (Chinese: 中国航空油料). The minority shareholders of the subsidiary were Sinopec and PetroChina, the listed subsidiaries of fellow oil giant State-owned Assets Supervision and Administration Commission of the State Council.

The corporation had a controversial net loss in 2004, which resulted by the arrest of Chen Jiulin, president of Singapore-listed subsidiary China Aviation Oil.

== Subsidiaries ==
As of 31 December 2013

- China National Aviation Fuel Supply (51.00%)
- China National Aviation Fuel Land Petroleum (100.00%)
- China National Aviation Fuel Logistic (100.00%)
- China Aviation Oil (50.88%)

== Equity investments ==
As of October 2016

- Haikou Meilan International Airport (2.08% owned by CNAF Co., Ltd.)
- Shenzhen Petrochemical Exchange
