= Sumitomo copper affair =

Metal trading scandal in Japan

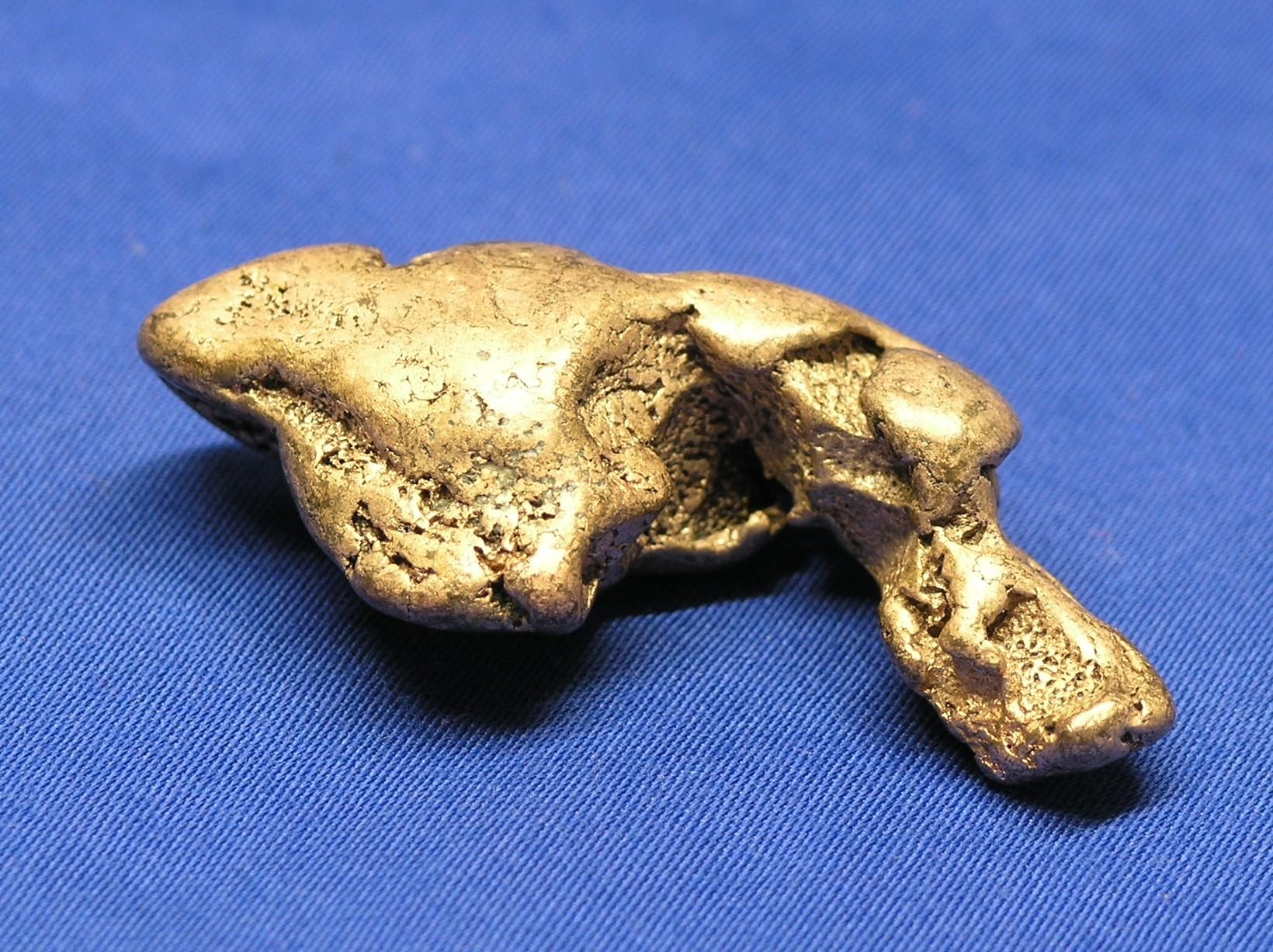
A copper nugget

The Sumitomo copper affair refers to a metal trading scandal in 1996 involving Yasuo Hamanaka, the chief copper trader of the Japanese trading house Sumitomo Corporation (Sumitomo). The scandal involves unauthorized trading over a 10-year period by Hamanaka, which led Sumitomo to announce US$1.8 billion in related losses in 1996 when Hamanaka's trading was discovered, and more related losses subsequently. The scandal also involved Hamanaka's attempts to corner the entire world's copper market through LME Copper futures contracts on the London Metal Exchange (LME).

The affair was a major scandal which is at times compared in magnitude to the Silver Thursday scandal, involving the Hunt family's attempt to corner the world's silver markets. It currently ranks in the top 10 trading losses in financial history.

== Hamanaka's decade of unauthorized trading ==
Hamanaka and his superior, Saburo Shimizu, began speculating without authorization using copper forward contracts on the LME in 1985 in an attempt to recoup an earlier loss from their trading in physical copper in the Philippines. They were not successful, and their losses rose to US$60 million. Shimizu resigned at this point. Both traders felt that they could not report these losses to their superiors, but Hamanaka believed he could recover the losses through further trading. Hamanaka would state later at his trial in 1997 that his motivation for the scheme was to cover earlier losses, both before and during his promotion to Sumitomo's head copper trader, and not for personal gain. Shimizu supports his account of this motivation. Whatever his motivations, Hamanaka hid his losses by keeping a secret book of unauthorized trading, and by destroying documents, lying to his supervisors, forging trading data, and forging signatures. These tactics successfully hid his activities and Sumitomo promoted him to head copper trader in 1986.

=== Different schemes to recoup losses ===
To recoup his earlier trading losses, Hamanaka embarked on a variety of schemes to profitably trade copper by cornering the market. Depending on the context, prosecutors usually focus on just one or two of the schemes depending on their interest and jurisdiction.

Hamanaka's dealings with David Campbell began in 1989 with a discussion about his intentions of driving up the copper price by cornering the world market. Campbell was then president of the private metals trading firm RST Resources, inc. (RST). From 1989 to 1992, Hamanaka conducted significant amounts of business with RST, and became the firm's biggest client. In 1993, Campbell resigned from RST and founded Global Minerals and Mining Corp (Global), and Hamanaka switched to doing business with Global.

Hamanaka entered into a string of monthly purchasing agreements with Global from 1994 to 1997. Hamanaka would purchase physical copper warrants, or claims on physical copper stored in warehouses, from Global, which purchased them from a Zambian copper producer. Hamanaka would then sell the warrants back to the Zambian producer to repeat the cycle. These transactions allowed Hamanaka to establish the appearance of a real copper business, and to allow him to claim commercial hedging justification to establish large futures positions to supposedly hedge the illusory transactions.

With the false commercial justification established, Hamanaka established a massive long copper futures contract position on the LME through an account established at Merrill Lynch for Global and through other small brokers. By September 1995, Sumitomo possessed two million tonnes of copper in the form of futures contracts, and nearly one half of LME Copper warrants. At this point, Hamanaka began to take delivery of copper warrants from expiring LME Copper contracts, which consolidated his control over the copper cash market. By November 24, 1995, Hamanaka controlled 93% of LME Copper warrants, and a dominant position in the LME Copper futures contract market. This forced traders who were short LME Copper futures, and who could not deliver physical copper, to purchase LME Copper futures from Hamanaka at high prices near the expiry of the contract to offset their position.

Hamanaka's dealings with David Threlkeld resulted in two attempts to warn the LME about Hamanaka's trading practices. Threlkeld's company, DLT Inc, traded copper for Hamanaka, and Paul Scully, a DLT employee, warned Threlkeld about problems in Hamanaka's trading practices in 1991. Scully would die in a July 1991 fire, which raised suspicions in 1996 after Hamanaka's fraudulent trading became public; however, two investigations ruled the fire was accidental. Threlkeld had separately received faxes from Hamanaka requesting to document $500 million of non-existent trades on DLT letterhead. Threlkeld refused, and complained to the LME. The LME discussed the letter with the Securities and Investments Board and Sumitomo management. Ultimately the LME decided it did not have jurisdiction to bring enforcement action against Hamanaka, but the LME did pressure Sumitomo to release Hamanaka's letter to the public, which did not result in any repercussions to Hamanaka at the time. Threlkeld separately confronted two of his employees in the DLT London office, Charles Vincent and Ashley Levett. Threlkeld subsequently fired Vincent, and Levett quit DLT. The two traders founded Winchester Commodities Group afterwards.

=== Role of US banks ===
US banks made loans to Hamanaka, sometimes in the form of unusual loan arrangements, that allowed Hamanaka to cover his losses and prolong his trading activity. As Hamanaka accumulated trading losses, he borrowed money to extend his positions or to hide losses. More than a dozen brokers at the LME had each extended on average US$150 million as credit lines to Hamanaka by mid-1993, and he faced difficulties obtaining more credit. To continue his activities, Hamanaka started borrowing from US banks in 1994. J.P. Morgan extended about US$400 million of credit to Hamanaka, and Chase Manhattan extended US$500 million. Separately, Merrill Lynch lent Hamanaka US$500 million to purchase copper warrants, and US$100 million in Commodity Inventory Purchase Obligations. Without credit from US banks, Hamanaka might not have been able to hide his losses for as long as he did, which might have led to the discovery of his trading schemes much sooner and reduced the eventual losses to Sumitomo.

=== Role of the LME ===
Hamanaka traded on the LME through broker members of the exchange as Sumitomo was not a member itself. He also traded indirectly with other parties with indirect relationships with LME through Over-the-Counter transactions. Contracts on the LME were held as forward contracts, which allowed Hamanaka to maintain positions through credit without covering daily mark-to-market margin payments with cash. By mid-1993, Hamanaka had more than a dozen credit lines with different LME brokers of US$150 million each to maintain his copper positions. The LME also had relatively lighter reporting and supervisory requirements relative to the COMEX (now Chicago Mercantile Exchange) copper futures market.

As Hamanaka's actions began to raise the price of LME Copper contracts, LME Copper futures contracts began to trade at a premium over COMEX Copper futures contracts, and began to attract physical copper supplies to move from COMEX warehouses into LME warehouses, in particular LME's new Long Beach warehouse opened in 1994. At this point copper prices entered into a state of backwardation, when copper spot prices became higher than copper futures prices. Market participants and regulators began to observe that copper stocks in COMEX warehouses began to decrease as expected in this environment, since merchants earn more selling copper stocks immediately than selling it later, whereas LME Copper stocks continued to increase despite a discount on forward selling prices. This warehouse behaviour led US regulators to more closely investigate Sumitomo.

=== Scheme collapse ===
The growing copper stocks at the LME Long Beach warehouse, and the related draining of copper stocks at COMEX warehouses caused the US Commodity Futures Trading Commission (CFTC) to investigate the copper market. However, the CFTC was only able to get the LME, Securities and Investments Board (SIB), and Sumitomo to start an investigation into Hamanaka's copper trading in April 1996, many months after Hamanaka was able to establish his market position.

Sumitomo discovered Hamanaka's unauthorized account and positions at Merrill Lynch and removed Hamanaka from his post on May 9, 1996. Hamanaka confessed to the scheme on June 5, 1996. On June 13, 1996, Sumitomo announced US$1.8 billion of losses related to Hamanaka's trades. Sumitomo then began to unwind Hamanaka's futures and cash copper positions, which caused copper prices to plummet from a high of US$2800 in May 1996 to a two and a half year low of US$1800 on June 25, 1996. Sumitomo eventually suffered US$2.6 billion in losses from Hamanaka's positions, and a further US$200 million related to subsequent lawsuits on the affair.

== Aftermath ==
In 1997, a Tokyo court found Hamanaka guilty on four counts of forgery and fraud and sentenced him to eight years in jail. Hamanaka was not charged with market manipulation, but Sumitomo paid fines of US$150 million to CFTC and US$8 million to the SIB to settle charges of copper price manipulations. In 1999, Sumitomo sued Merrill Lynch, UBS, Credit-Lyonnais Rouse, and Morgan Stanley for damages in an amount exceeding US$2 billion for aiding and abetting Hamanaka. Merrill Lynch settled with Sumitomo for US$275 million, JP Morgan settled for US$125 million, and UBS settled for $86 million. Credit-Lyonnais Rouse settled for an undisclosed amount.

The fact that Sumitomo Corporation were not members of the LME at the time of Hamanaka's dealings meant that, subsequent to the scandal and understanding of his trading activities, the LME undertook a revision of its membership categories and the reporting requirements of its members, so that greater transparency of larger positions held by non-members who trade via broker-members, would help avoid a similar occurrence.

== See also ==
- State Reserves Bureau copper scandal
- Silver Thursday
- List of trading losses
- Herbert Black
