= Silver Thursday =

1980 crash in the U.S. silver market

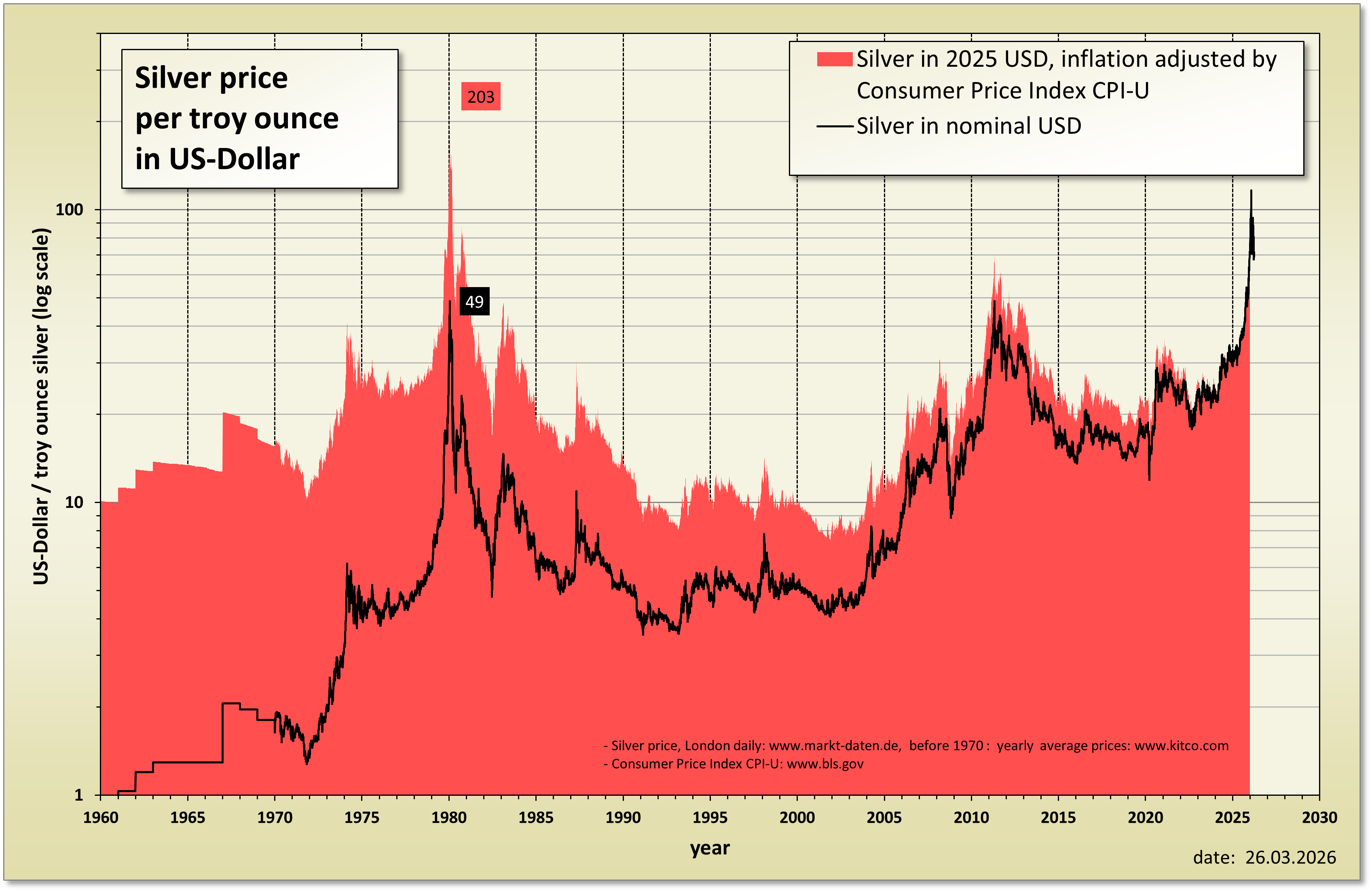
Silver price history in 1960–2020 showing the Silver Thursday event in 1980

Silver Thursday refers to the sharp collapse in the United States silver and silver futures markets on Thursday, March 27, 1980. The crisis followed a rapid rise in silver prices and the accumulation of a large long position by members of the Hunt family, principally Nelson Bunker Hunt and William Herbert Hunt, with Lamar Hunt involved to a lesser extent. The term is used both for the trading day itself and for the broader 1979–1980 silver crisis.

By the end of 1979, Bunker Hunt, Herbert Hunt and the Hunt-related International Metals Investment Company controlled approximately 195 million troy ounces of silver. Silver, which had traded below $10 per troy ounce before August 1979, rose to $34.45 by December 31 and to more than $50 in January 1980.

The price decline accelerated amid exchange actions that included stricter margin requirements, position limits and liquidation-only trading rules. As prices fell, the Hunts could not meet all demands for additional cash and collateral. On March 27, 1980, silver closed at $10.80 per ounce, Hunt-related positions were liquidated, and major brokers and lenders faced potential losses.

== Background ==
Nelson Bunker Hunt and William Herbert Hunt, sons of oilman H. L. Hunt, began acquiring silver in the early 1970s. According to a later report by the U.S. Securities and Exchange Commission (SEC), Bunker Hunt purchased an estimated 20 million troy ounces in late 1973, and Bunker and Herbert Hunt together accumulated about 50 million ounces by early 1974.

The Hunts expanded their position substantially in 1979. From July 31, 1979, to January 1, 1980, the amount of silver controlled by Bunker Hunt, Herbert Hunt and International Metals Investment Company rose from about 123 million ounces to about 195 million ounces. During the same period, the market price rose from roughly $9 to about $35 per ounce, increasing the apparent value of the position from about $1.1 billion to about $6.8 billion.

A major source of risk was leverage. About half of the Hunt-related position at the end of 1979 was held in silver futures rather than physical silver. Because futures contracts required only a margin deposit rather than full payment for the metal, a rapid fall in prices could produce very large margin calls. The futures commission merchants carrying the accounts were responsible to the exchanges if the Hunts failed to perform.

Industrial users and jewelers objected to the price spike. On March 26, 1980, Tiffany & Co. ran an advertisement in The New York Times headed "Unconscionable", criticizing the hoarding of "several billion ... dollars' worth of silver" and the effect of high prices on businesses and consumers that used silver.

== Exchange response and price reversal ==
The principal U.S. silver exchanges responded in stages. The COMEX board held numerous special or emergency meetings during the rise in prices, while the Commodity Futures Trading Commission (CFTC) remained in contact with the exchange. On January 7, 1980, COMEX imposed position limits on silver futures. On January 21, it limited trading in silver futures to liquidation orders and bona fide hedging transactions; the Chicago Board of Trade adopted a similar restriction.

The restrictions coincided with a reversal in prices. On January 22, the spot silver price fell by about $10 to $34 per ounce. It traded between roughly $31 and $38.50 through early March, then fell again from $29.75 on March 10 to $10.80 on March 27.

As prices fell, the Hunt-related accounts required large payments of variation margin. The Hunts also faced payment obligations on silver they had agreed to take delivery of, including transactions with Phibro and Engelhard.

== Silver Thursday ==
By late March 1980, several brokers carrying Hunt-related silver accounts were exposed to large losses. One of the most important was Bache Halsey Stuart Shields, later part of Prudential Securities. Bache had carried large Hunt silver positions and had also made silver-backed loans to Hunt entities.

On March 25 and 26, 1980, Herbert Hunt told major creditors and brokers that the Hunts no longer had sufficient cash or collateral to meet margin calls. Bache continued to make required margin payments to clearinghouses even though it had not received corresponding funds from the Hunts. When silver fell sharply on March 27, Bache liquidated Hunt-related silver futures positions. At March 27 prices, the unsecured debit balance in Hunt accounts at Bache was about $122 million, an amount that would have severely reduced Bache's net worth.

The SEC suspended trading in Bache common stock on March 27 because of the abrupt decline in silver prices and the resulting margin calls on Hunt accounts. Trading resumed on April 1. The SEC staff later concluded that the collapse threatened broader disruption because broker-dealers and banks with Hunt-related exposure could have suffered substantial losses.

== Rescue loan ==
After the collapse, a consortium of thirteen banks arranged a $1.1 billion loan to Placid Oil, a Hunt family company. The loan was secured by oil and gas properties, refineries and pipelines, and was guaranteed by Bunker Hunt, Herbert Hunt and Lamar Hunt. The loan helped satisfy obligations to brokers and lenders and reduced the risk of immediate failures at firms exposed to the Hunt accounts.

The Hunts also resolved a large obligation to Engelhard by transferring interests in petroleum exploration assets and allowing Engelhard to retain silver collateral.

== Investigations and litigation ==
The SEC and CFTC investigated the events surrounding the silver crisis. The CFTC later brought market-manipulation proceedings against members of the Hunt family.

In 1988, a federal jury found Bunker Hunt, Herbert Hunt, Lamar Hunt and other defendants liable in a civil action brought by Minpeco, a Peruvian mineral marketing company. The jury found that the defendants had conspired to corner the silver market. After trebling and offsets for earlier settlements, the judgment was reported at $134 million.

The judgment added to financial pressure on the Hunts. In September 1988, Bunker Hunt and Herbert Hunt filed for protection under Chapter 11 of the U.S. Bankruptcy Code, among the largest personal bankruptcy filings in Texas at the time. In 1989, Bunker Hunt and Herbert Hunt settled CFTC charges; contemporary reports said they were fined and barred from trading commodities.

== See also ==
- List of trading losses
- Silver as an investment
- State Reserves Bureau copper scandal
- Sumitomo copper affair
- Trading Places, a 1983 comedy film involving an attempted commodities-market manipulation
