= Manhattan Investment Fund =

Manhattan Investment Fund was a hedge fund managed by Michael Berger, who pursued an investment strategy of betting against US stocks that appeared to be overvalued. During the stock market bubble of the late 1990s, this strategy led to about $400 million in losses on IT related products. Berger hid the losses from the investors in the fund for more than three years. This resulted in criminal charges against Berger for securities fraud.

The Manhattan Investment Fund fraud resembled the Madoff fraud in certain respects. In both cases regulators failed to catch the fraud. The broker-dealer, a heavily regulated firm, enabled Berger to mislead his clients and the fund's administrator and auditor.

After Bear Stearns, the fund's prime broker, complained to the Securities and Exchange Commission, the fund was shut down and a court-appointed trustee, Helen Gredd, was given control of the remaining assets. The lawsuits from the fraud lasted many years, including a case by the trustee against Bear Stearns.

Berger was charged with fraud, but he jumped bail and did not show up at the New York court where he was to be sentenced. After five years as a fugitive, he was arrested in Austria. As an Austrian citizen he was not extradited to the US, where he would have faced a 6 1/2-year term for the fraud and another five years for jumping bail. He was in prison for almost two years in Austria.
