= Amaranth Advisors =

American multi-strategy hedge fund

- Company type: Private
- Industry: Hedge funds
- Founded: 2000 in Greenwich, CT, United States
- Founder: Nicholas Maounis
- Defunct: September 2007
- Fate: Bankrupted
- Number of locations: Houston, London, Singapore, Toronto, Greenwich (2006)
- Key people: • Robert Jones (Chief Risk Officer); • Charles H. Winkler (COO)
- AUM: US$9.2 billion (at its peak Aug 2006)

Amaranth Advisors LLC was an American multi-strategy hedge fund founded by Nicholas M. Maounis and headquartered in Greenwich, Connecticut. At its peak, the firm had $9.2 billion in assets under management before collapsing in September 2006, after losing in excess of $6 billion on natural gas futures. Amaranth Advisors collapse is one of the biggest hedge fund collapses in history and at the time (2006) largest known trading losses.

== History ==
=== 2000 founding ===
The company was founded in 2000 by Nicholas M. Maounis and based in Greenwich, Connecticut. Throughout much of its history, convertible arbitrage was the firm's primary profit vehicle. Maounis had prior to founding Amaranth Advisors worked at Paloma Partners as a portfolio manager covering debt securities. The company was named after the amaranth an "immortal" flower that retains vivid color even after death.

=== 2004–2005 Focus on energy trading ===
During 2004-2005, the firm shifted its emphasis to energy trading, led by the success of Canadian trader Brian Hunter who invested in the natural gas market. In 2005 the firm made an estimated $1 billion on rising energy prices after Hurricane Katrina curtailed production.

Natural gas trading gradually came to dominate Amaranth Advisors, which previously had been more diversified in strategy and investments. The financial success of Hunter's trades attracted increasing attention from investors, leading to massive inflows of cash. Hunter's prominence in the firm also raised calls for caution from both inside and outside Amaranth by those who worried being concentrated in a single volatile commodity introduced major risks.

=== 2006 Energy trading losses ===
==== 2005 Dec – natural gas price decline ====
Amaranth Advisors' troubles began in December 2005 as natural gas prices began to decline and Amaranth Advisors portfolio was structured for the price to move in the spring months of March or April.

Hunter, who was 32 years old at the time, invested heavily in natural gas futures which resulted in a single week loss of $6.5 billion when prices failed to move as expected.

==== Sept 18th 2006 – client told of losses ====
On Monday September 18, 2006 Amaranth Advisors told investors that natural gas market downturn had resulted in $3 billion of losses. Further, Amaranth Advisors told investors that it was working with lenders for maintaining liquidity while also and now selling portfolio holdings "to protect our investors". Traders sold securities that could be liquidated without undermining and disrupting the energy market; these included convertible bonds and high-yield corporate debt.

==== Transferring energy portfolio ====
The fund had up to $9 billion under management and reports indicated their losses may have exceeded 65 percent of their investment. Amaranth transferred its energy portfolio to a third party consisting of Citadel LLC and JPMorgan Chase.

==== October 1, 2006 Fund suspends trading ====
On September 29, 2006, Amaranth's founder sent a letter to fund investors notifying them of the fund's suspension and on October 1, 2006, Amaranth hired the Fortress Investment Group to liquidate its assets.

In September 2006 Amaranth Advisors investors were informed that they could not pull their money out and that redemptions would be temporarily suspended for two months. Ten years later, 90% of assets had been returned and 10% of investor assets were still frozen through December 2016.

=== Aftermath ===
After the collapse of Amaranth, Maounis founded a new hedge fund named Verition Fund Management. Several ex-Amaranth employees were hired to work at the new fund.

== Clients ==
Amaranth Advisors' investors included pension funds, endowments, banks and brokerage firms including Institutional Fund of Hedge Funds at Morgan Stanley. Pension fund clients included San Diego County Employees Retirement Association.

== Investigations ==
=== 2007 CFTC investigation ===
On July 25, 2007, the Commodity Futures Trading Commission (CFTC) charged Amaranth and Hunter with attempting to manipulate the price of natural gas futures. Additionally, the Federal Energy Regulatory Commission charged Amaranth, Hunter and trader Matthew Donohoe with market manipulation. The CFTC and the FERC had conflicting versions of what Hunter did, and are currently competing over jurisdiction. In 2014 Hunter settled with the CFTC, paying a $750,000 fine and accepting a ban from trading all CFTC-regulated natural-gas products.

=== 2010 Federal Energy Regulatory Commission ===
On January 22, 2010, a Federal Energy Regulatory Commission administrative law judge ruled that Hunter violated the Commission's Anti-Manipulation Rule. Judge Carmen Cintron found that "Hunter intentionally manipulated the settlement price of the at-issue natural gas futures contracts. His trading was specifically designed to lower the NYMEX price in order to benefit his swap positions on other exchanges." The decision is subject to review by the Commission.

== Legal ==
In November 2007 Amaranth Advisors filed a lawsuit against JPMorgan claiming $1 billion in damages on the grounds that the bank interfered in the company's efforts to avoid collapse after natural-gas trades losses in 2006. The suit claimed that JP Morgan, as Amaranth Advisors's clearing broker, used their position to prevent Amaranth Advisors from derisking their exposure from its natural-gas derivatives portfolio by preventing the portfolio from being sold to first Goldman Sachs and later Citadel LLC.

In December 2012, the New York State Court of Appeals upheld an earlier dismissal of the case. During the collapse of Amaranth Advisors, Centaurus was credited as being one of the major players on the other side of their position.

== Criticism ==
During the week of September 11, 2006, one week before clients were notified of losses, Amaranth Advisors was seeking new investors and marketing their fund as being up 25 percent for the year.

The New York Times reported that Amaranth Advisors said it was a multi-strategy fund though it acted "like an energy and commodities fund. When it bet big on natural gas and lost, it was apparent that it was neither multistrategy nor particularly well hedged" and also that in Amaranth Advisors' case "'multistrategy' seems to have been a misnomer at the fund."

Nassim Nicholas Taleb proposed the company's use of "twelve risk managers" was meaningless, as the risk models failed to anticipate or ameliorate the problems that ended Amaranth Advisors.
