= Heinz Schimmelbusch =

Heinz C. Schimmelbusch
- Known for: CEO of AMG N.V.

Dr. Heinz C. Schimmelbusch (born 1944) is an Austrian businessman, serving as the chief executive officer of AMG Advanced Metallurgical Group N.V.

== Background and education ==
Schimmelbusch was born in Vienna. He received his graduate degree (with distinction) and his doctorate (magna cum laude) from the University of Tübingen, Tübingen, Baden-Württemberg, Germany.

== Career ==
In 1971, Schimmelbusch was working as a general manager at Nukem.

Metallgesellschaft

Schimmelbusch began his career at Metallgesellschaft AG, also known as MG, in 1973. Between 1989 and 1993 he was the chief executive officer of Metallgesellschaft. Metallgesellschaft, based in Frankfurt, was one of Germany's largest industrial conglomerates. It had over 250 subsidiaries specializing in mining, specialty chemicals (Chemetall), commodity trading, financial services and engineering (Lurgi).

Under the leadership of CEO Schimmelbusch, Metallgesellschaft entered the oil business by selling fuel to customers via its American subsidiary, MG Refining and Marketing in the form of fixed price long-term contracts (up to 10 years). Metallgesellschaft attempted to hedge its exposure to rising oil prices on the futures market. However, in 1993, oil prices began to drop and Metallgesellschaft's derivatives strategy turned into extensive paper losses. The company's largest shareholder, Deutsche Bank found out and responded by ousting Schimmelbusch and liquidating Metallgesellschaft's positions which turned the virtual losses into real losses.

The decision by the MG AG supervisory board to end MG Refining and Marketing (MGRM)'s marketing program early – against loud protests from Schimmelbusch and the management board – led to international controversy. Metallgesellschaft almost went bankrupt after losing an estimated $1.3 billion on speculative bets in oil future markets.

Among the many who analyzed the MGRM debacle were the late Nobel laureate Merton Miller, Steve Hanke, and Christopher Culp. Together Miller and Culp wrote seven articles and co-edited one book attempting to explain what was really going on at MGRM. Prof. Hanke, who was Chris Culp's Professor at Johns Hopkins, became involved in May 1994. Professor Hanke and Mr. Culp wrote an essay published in International Economy magazine supporting the work Miller and Culp had done. In September 1994, Prof Hanke wrote a Forbes column in which he argued that MG would have broken even on their hedge if it had not been liquidated. Merton Miller and Christopher Culp resolved early in their analysis of MGRM that to preserve credibility in the face of growing controversy, they would neither accept any payment for any of that work nor would they communicate with any of the principal players at MGRM or MG AG. Professor Miller and Christopher Culp were merely analyzing the facts and the economics of the case. That this proved to be a defense of Schimmelbusch's actions was a consequence of the facts, not a deliberate effort on their parts. MG and Schimmelbusch settled the lawsuit with MG even helping to pay his legal fees.

Safeguard International Fund, L.P.

Following this controversy at Metallgesellschaft, Schimmelbusch moved to Wayne, Pennsylvania in the United States. In 1997, in cooperation with Michael R. Holly and Arthur R. Spector, he formed Safeguard International Fund, L.P. (SIF), a private equity fund which had US$305 million of equity capital under management. It was formed to make acquisitions of technologically oriented metallurgical businesses in North America and Western Europe. SIF made 10 principal investments, including Metallurg Holdings, Inc., ALD Vacuum Technologies GmbH and Sudamin Holdings LLC. These businesses were eventually merged to form AMG Advanced Metallurgical Group N.V.

SIF also invested in PFW Aerospace AG and Scan Wafer AS, which was eventually merged into Renewable Energy Corp AS. SIF has returned over US$625 million in cash and shares to its investors to date.

Schimmelbusch is also a member of the executive committee of the general partner of SIF. In November 2002, he was appointed chief executive officer of Metallurg. He also served as chairman of the board of Metallurg and Metallurg Holdings.

Past Directorships

Schimmelbusch's directorships have also included MMC Norilsk Nickel, Allianz Versicherung AG, Mobil Oil AG, Teck Cominco Limited, and Methanex Corporation.

Schimmelbusch served as a member of the Presidency of the Federation of German Industries (BDI) and the Presidency of the International Chamber of Commerce (ICC).

== Present ==
AMG Critical Materials N.V.

In July 2006, Schimmelbusch took AMG public on Euronext Amsterdam.

Schimmelbusch was appointed chief executive officer and Chairman of the AMG Critical Materials N.V. Management Board on November 21, 2006, and was reappointed for a term of four years on May 11, 2011. He has served in a similar capacity, for businesses that comprise AMG since 1998. AMG filed an initial public offering on the Euronext exchange in Amsterdam in June 2007. AMG creates and applies innovative metallurgical solutions for energy, aerospace, infrastructure and specialty metals and chemical markets. Using secure raw materials strategies, vertical and horizontal industry consolidations and investments in technology, AMG produces products that contribute to CO_{2} reduction.

Present Directorships

Schimmelbusch serves as a Director of various companies including Allied Resource Corporation in Wayne, Pennsylvania, United States and PFW Aerospace AG in Speyer, Rhineland-Palatinate, Germany.
