= State Reserve Bureau =

The State Reserve Bureau also known as State Bureau of Material Reserve was part of the National Development and Reform Commission of the government of China. In 2018, it was re-organized into the newly created National Food and Strategic Reserves Administration.

The bureau was responsible for managing strategic material reserves such as copper, iron, etc. and managing funds, assets, infrastructure, etc. It also manages trading in material reserves such as metals.

In 2005, it released 80,000 tonnes of copper into the global market amid rapidly rising copper prices.

The bureau gained attention within the press in 2005 when a rogue trader vanished for some time as part of the State Reserves Bureau copper scandal.
