= China Aviation Oil =

China Aviation Oil Singapore Corp. Ltd.
- Company type: Public
- Traded as: SGX: G92
- Headquarters: 8 Temasek Boulevard #31-02 Suntec Tower Three Singapore 038988
- Parent: China National Aviation Fuel

China Aviation Oil (Singapore) Corporation Ltd (CAO) is the largest purchaser of jet fuel in the Asia Pacific region and supplies jet fuel to the civil aviation industry of the People's Republic of China (PRC). CAO supplies to the three key international airport in the PRC, i.e. Beijing Capital International Airport, Shanghai Pudong International Airport and Guangzhou Baiyun International Airport, and accounts for more than 90% of PRC's jet fuel imports. CAO also engages in international trading of jet fuel and other oil products such as fuel oil and gas oil. CAO owns investments in strategic oil-related businesses, which include Shanghai Pudong International Airport Aviation Fuel Supply Company Ltd and China National Aviation Fuel TSN-PEK Pipeline Transportation Corporation Ltd.

The company was incorporated on 26 May 1993, and has been listed on the Singapore Exchange since December 2001.

Revenue for 2023 was $14.4bn (down 12.4% from $16.5bn in 2022 due to falling oil prices and trading volume). Revenue was also affected by a reduced number of international flights - according to the Civil Aviation Administration of China, there were only 3,368 international passenger flights per week at the end of June (that's 44% of pre-pandemic levels). However, net income for 2023 was $58.9 million (up 75.5 per cent from $33.5 million in FY 2022).

== 2004 Scandal ==
CAO began trading oil-related derivatives to hedge its purchases of jet fuel against the volatility of the price of oil. However, CAO had not updated its risk management rules to reflect the more aggressive trading strategy, and its control was loose around its traders. This led to traders even exceeding the current limitations set out by CAO. According to CAO, "As the prices of crude oil were at an all time high at above $55 per barrel, the company faced significant margin calls on its open positions and did not have the resources to satisfy the margin calls". It resulted in US$550 million loss, causing the largest financial scandal to rock Singapore since the collapse of Barings Bank in 1995.

SGX appointed PricewaterhouseCoopers as an auditor to investigate "the circumstances leading to the losses at CAO, the internal controls, risk management and governance practices of CAO, and to report its findings to the Exchange."

CAO then turned to its parent company China Aviation Oil Holding (CAOH) which provided an emergency loan of $100 million, however, it was insufficient which led to a proper restructuring. BP, Temasek Holdings and CAOH agreed to invest 130 million, staving off bankruptcy, preventing the company from being liquidated. Chen Jiulin, CEO of CAO, and four other executives of CAO was arrested as a result of the scandal. Chen pleaded guilty to "insider trading, failure to disclose losses, making false financial statements and conspiring to deceive Deutsche Bank into handling the sale of a stake in the company in 2004".

== 2020 Allegations of Fraud ==
Swiss Bank Banque de Commerce et de Placements SA (BCP) sued China Aviation Oil over a $19 million fraudulent deal. BCP gave ZenRock Commodities Trading Pte Ltd a credit letter to purchase 260,000 barrels of oil from CAO. However, Zenrock planned to sell the barrels to PetroChina International (East China) Co. Ltd. instead. BCP had paid CAO $19 million after the company showed documentation indicating that the cargo had been loaded onto an oil tanker in Malacca in Malaysia where Zenrock was responsible for its delivery. BCP claims that CAO has made false representations, thus also claiming that CAO "had acted in breach of the letter of credit". BCP is now claiming damages with interest on top of the original amount it had paid for the cargo.

CAO denies all allegations and claims that the cargo was in fact shipped from Malacca on 27 January 2020 abroad the Vietnam-flagged tanker, Petrolimex 18. It also had received payment from the letter of credit's bank, which is not BCP.

== Implications with Hin Leong ==
Lim Oon Kuin, founder Hin Leong, had instigated an employee to forge documentation issued by UT Singapore Services Pte Ltd to show that Hin Leong had transferred one million metric tons of Fuel Oil and Gas Oil and more to China Aviation Oil between June 2019 and March 2020. These documents were allegedly used to obtain US$484,489,067.43 from a financial institution.

Lim Oon Kuin conspired with another Hin Leong employee to forge 8 Certificates of Quality from Amspec Testing Services Pte Ltd, which shows that samples of oil had been retrieved and tested. These certificates were then sent to CAO to show that independent testing had been carried out to certify the quality of the oil that was purportedly sold by Hin Leong to CAO.

Lim Oon Kuin also instigated another Hin Leong employee to forge three documents which were supposedly issued by UT Singapore Services Pte Ltd. It claimed that 167,000 Metric Tons of Gasoil were transferred from Hin Leong to CAO.
