= LME Copper =

Contract trader

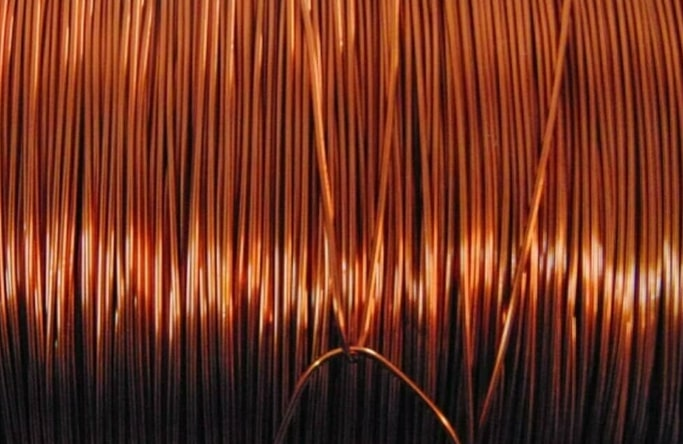
LME Copper contracts represent a small share of global copper trade.

LME Copper is a group of spot, forward, and futures contracts, trading on the London Metal Exchange (LME), for delivery of Copper (Grade A), which can be used for price Hedging, physical delivery of sales or purchases, investment, and speculation.

As of 2019, LME Copper contracts are associated with 144,675 tonnes of physical copper reportedly stored in LME-approved warehouses around the world, or around 0.7% of 2019 world copper production of 20.6 million tonnes.

== History ==
Despite the small share of physical copper associated with LME Copper contracts, their prices act as reference prices for global physical copper transactions. This practice began in 1966, when Zambia, Chile, and most copper-producing countries abandoned fixed-price copper contracts and announced that they would set copper contract prices based on the average monthly price of the nearest contract-month LME Copper futures contract. This pattern of using LME futures contract prices as reference prices for physical transactions spread to other base metals in the 1970s and to aluminium in the 1980s.

== Contract description ==
LME Copper contracts trade on the London Metal Exchange, which began trading in the metal at the founding of the exchange in 1877. The contracts require physical delivery of the asset for settlement, and deliverable assets for the contracts are 25 tonnes of Grade A copper cathode. The contract prices are quoted in US dollars per tonne. LME prices have minimum tick sizes of US$0.5 per tonne (or US$12.5 for one contract) for open outcry trading in the LME Ring and electronic trading on LME Select, while minimum tick sizes are reduced for inter-office telephone trading to US$0.01 per tonne (or US$0.5 for one contract). Carry trades involving Aluminium futures also have reduced minimum tick sizes at US$0.01 per tonne. Contracts are organized along LME's prompt date (or delivery date) structure.

=== Prompt date structure ===
LME offers three groups of LME Copper contracts with daily, weekly, and monthly delivery dates. Contracts with daily settlement dates are available from two days to three months in the future, for example on 2020-05-12, contracts were available for 2020-05-14, 2020-05-18, 2020-05-19, 2020-08-10, 2020-08-11, and 2020-08-12. Contracts with weekly settlement dates are available from three months to six months in the future, which means that on 2020-05-12, contracts with weekly delivery dates for 2020-08-12, 2020-08-19, 2020-08-26, 2020-11-12, 2020-11-18, and 2020-11-25 are available for trading. Contracts with monthly settlement dates are available from six months to 123 months in the future, which means that on 2020-05-12, contracts with monthly delivery dates for 2020-05-20, 2020-06-17, 2020-07-15, 2030-06-19, 2030-07-17, and 2030-08-21 are available for trading.

The origins of the LME prompt date system, particularly the three-month daily prompt date system, date back to LME copper trading at the beginning of the exchange. The opening of the Suez Canal in 1869, reduced the London delivery time of tin from Malaya to match the three-month delivery time for copper from Chile. When the LME was founded in 1877 based on copper and tin trading, the exchange instituted the daily prompt date contracts to match the delivery times of those commodities.

== Non-commercial uses ==
LME Copper contracts with delivery dates up to 123 months into the future are available, and prices of those contracts can produce forecasts of the spot price of copper at those delivery times. However, LME Copper price forecasts of spot copper prices were found to exhibit biases.

LME Copper futures prices are also a part of the S&P GSCI commodity index, which is a benchmark index widely followed in financial markets by traders and institutional investors. Its weighting in these commodity indices gives LME Copper futures prices a non-trivial influence on returns on a wide range of investment funds and portfolios. Conversely, traders and investors have become non-trivial participants in the market for LME Copper contracts and have had a better track record than commercial participants in the copper supply chain at predicting copper industrial cycles.

LME Copper has been used as an important financial and economic signal. Contract prices have been used as signals for general financial market conditions and equity market returns. They have also been used as leading indicators for economic activity and business cycles.

== Related derivatives ==
The Chicago Mercantile Exchange (CME) and the Shanghai Futures Exchange (SHFE) also offer copper futures contracts. Market studies have shown that all three markets are closely linked and that LME-traded copper contracts are the dominant source of price discovery for the other exchanges.

Financial market conventions and empirical studies have grouped copper futures contracts with other base metals futures contracts as an asset class or a sub-asset class. The base metals grouping usually includes futures contracts on aluminium (sometimes including aluminium alloy contracts), copper, lead, nickel, tin, and zinc, and they are also sometimes called Industrial Metals, Non-ferrous Metals, and Non-precious Metals. All of the metals in this group have associated LME contracts available for trading.

== Sumitomo copper affair ==
From 1986 to 1996, the head copper trader of Sumitomo corporation, Yasuo Hamanaka, sought to manipulate the LME Copper market by secretly building a dominant market position in the LME Copper spot and futures markets. Through facetious purchasing and sale agreements, Hamanaka established the illusion of a large commercial Copper operation at Sumitomo, which allowed him to purchase large amounts of LME Copper futures contracts and warrants to corner the LME Copper market. By November 24, 1995, Hamanaka controlled 93% of all outstanding LME copper warrants, which are claims on physical copper in the LME warehouse system. Hamanaka's Copper market position led world copper prices to rise rapidly, which led to physical copper leaving COMEX warehouses for LME warehouses, notably LME's Long Beach warehouse. The rapid movement of copper prices and of physical copper out of COMEX warehouses led to investigations by the Commodity Futures Trading Commission (CFTC) and the Securities and Investments Board (SIB). Ultimately, Sumitomo cooperated with these investigations and dismissed Hamanaka, which led Hamanaka to confess in 1996. Hamanaka's speculative position contributed to LME Contract prices to rise to $2800 per tonne in May 1996, and Sumitomo's subsequent unwinding of that position contributed to those same prices to plunge to $1785 per tonne, a two-and-a-half-year low, on June 25, 1996, almost two months later. The affair cost Sumitomo US$2.6 billion in losses.

In response to the affair, LME began to publish more meaningful open interest data, information on large warrants and trading positions, and daily LME warehouse stocks for all relevant LME contracts, including LME Copper contracts. The affair also led seventeen commodity market regulators from sixteen countries to meet at the Tokyo Commodity Futures Markets Regulators' Conference to discuss proposed regulatory oversight of the world's commodity futures markets in 1997. The market regulators endorsed the best practices, standards of market surveillance, and intentions for regulatory information sharing among the endorsing countries.

== State Reserve Bureau copper scandal ==
The State Reserves Bureau Copper Scandal refers to a loss of approximately US$150 million as a result of trading LME Copper futures contracts at the London Metal Exchange (LME) by rogue trader Liu Qibing, who was a trader for the Import and Export Department of the State Regulation Centre for Supply Reserves (SRCSR), the trading agency for the State Reserve Bureau (SRB) of China in 2005.
