= Brian Hunter (trader) =

Canadian natural gas trader (born c. 1974)

Brian Hunter (born c. 1974) is a Canadian former natural gas trader for the now closed Amaranth Advisors hedge fund. Amaranth had over $9 billion in assets but collapsed in 2006 after Hunter's gamble on natural gas futures market went bad.

== Early life ==
Hunter grew up near Calgary, Alberta, and earned a master's degree in mathematics from the University of Alberta.

== Deutsche Bank ==
Hunter gained experience at Calgary based TransCanada Corp. before moving to New York to join Deutsche Bank in May 2001. There, he made $69 million for the bank in his first two years. By 2003, Hunter was promoted to head of the bank's natural gas desk. In December 2003 Hunter's trading group lost $51 million in a single week in an excessively risky trade. In a New York state court lawsuit, Hunter ascribed the loss to "an unprecedented and unforeseeable run-up in gas prices," meaning Hunter's failure to foresee the risk of his own trade rendered him blameless for its consequences. Hunter also blamed Deutsche's trading software for allowing him to take large gambles. Finally Hunter said he had earned $40 million for the bank during 2003, and therefore not only was he not responsible for the loss, he actually deserved a bonus. Deutsche Bank denied the allegations and he subsequently was let go from the firm.

== Amaranth ==
In April 2005, Hunter was, reportedly, offered a $1 million bonus to join SAC Capital Partners. Nicholas Maounis, founder of Amaranth Advisors, refused to let Hunter go. Maounis named Hunter co-head of the firm's energy desk and gave him control of his own trades. Hunter earned around $100 million a year and 15 percent of his profits due to Amaranth's "eat what you kill" bonus arrangement.

In 2006, Hunter's analysis led him to believe that 2006–07 winter's gas prices would rise relative to the summer and fall — accordingly Hunter went long on the winter delivery contracts, simultaneously shorting the near (summer/fall) contracts. When the market took a sharp turn against this view, the fund was hard pressed for margin money to maintain the positions. Once the margin requirements crossed US$3 billion, around September 2006, the fund offloaded some of these positions, ultimately selling them entirely to JP Morgan and Citadel for US$2.5 billion. The fund ultimately took a $6.6-billion loss and had to be dissolved entirely.

Amaranth and Hunter were subsequently accused by the Commodity Futures Trading Commission of conspiring to manipulate natural gas prices. When a 2-day congressional hearing found Hunter not guilty of pushing up prices, and thus adversely affecting end consumers of the gas, CFTC framed accusations against Hunter for trying to push the prices too low and FERC framed similar ones, but going one step further, accused Hunter of being able to successfully do so.

In 2007, Hunter attempted to organize a new hedge fund, Solengo Capital Partners. However, his efforts were thwarted by regulatory agencies due to his previous questionable trading practices. Shortly after finding his new fund wrapped up in regulatory red tape, Hunter sold Solengo's assets to Peak Ridge Capital Group and was hired by the firm as an adviser to its Commodity Volatility Fund. In 1Q 2008, the fund was up nearly 49% while many other hedge funds suffered losses.

Hunter was the target of a $30 million fine to be levied by the Federal Energy Regulatory Commission in connection with the alleged manipulation of natural gas prices in 2006. In December 2007, Hunter sought to prevent the FERC from taking any action against him for his participation in trading in the natural gas futures market. A federal judge denied his request. In April 2011, the Federal Energy Regulatory Commission levied the expected $30 million penalty against Hunter, who has challenged the case in court.

On March 15, 2013, a U.S. appeals court ruled that FERC acted outside its statutory mandate after all in imposing this fine, since it is the Commodity Futures Trading Commission that has authority over derivatives trading.

== See also ==
- List of trading losses
