= Chen Jiulin =

Chen Jiulin (Chinese: 陈久霖) was born on October 20, 1961, and he is the former Managing Director and CEO of China Aviation Oil (Singapore) Corporation Ltd (CAO). During his leadership, CAO's net asset worth increased from US$176,000 to US$150,000,000, an increase of 85,200%. The market cap rose to 1.1 billion US dollars, which was 5,022 times the original value. Due to these incredible accomplishments, Chen Jiulin became a business legend and was named "The King of Aviation Oil".

In 2004, CAO suffered huge losses due to oil future trading. Chen was forced to leave the company and was arrested by the Singapore police. In March 2006, the Singapore court sentenced Chen Jiulin to four years and three months imprisonment. Chen Jiulin served 1035 days in Singapore prison and was released on bail on January 20, 2009.

== Early life ==
Chen was born in 1961 at Baolong Village of Xishui County, Huanggang City, Hubei Province.

In October 1981, Chen resigned from a bank in order to concentrate on the preparations for the college entrance exams and was admitted to Peking University in 1982. While studying in the Oriental Studies Department, he attended Vietnamese classes, but learned English at the same time. After that, he successfully obtained a master's degree in Private International Law from China University of Political Science and Law, a master's degree in Business Management from National University of Singapore and a PhD in Civil and Commercial Law from Tsinghua University.

== Career ==
After graduating from Peking University, Chen was employed by the Civil Aviation Administration of China, where he served as a translator and gained experience in the aviation business. After a reform, the organization was divided in five parts and Chen Jiulin was assigned to work with Air China. In 1990 joined a Sino-German joint venture named Aircraft Maintenance and Engineering Co. Ltd. Beijing, where he worked as an assistant to foreign experts. In 1993 he joined China Aviation Oil Supply Corporation and participated in the construction and negotiations of Hong Kong's new airport. After that, he worked as the Chinese chief negotiator for South China Bluesky Aviation Oil Co., Ltd., Tianjin International Petroleum Storage and Transportation Co., Ltd., and other large projects. All of them are the large Sino and foreign Joint Venture projects. CAO's predecessor, China Aviation Oil Transport (Singapore) Private Ltd., was also built up by Chen Jiulin.

During the Asian financial crisis in 1997, CAO's parent seconded Chen to take over the helm of CAO in Singapore, CAO (Singapore) Ltd., where he served as managing director and CEO. CAO was established in 1993 and after suffering losses during the first two years, it remained dormant for another two years. When Chen took control over the company, he only had US$219,000 and the company was quickly falling into red numbers at the end of 1997. In order to turn it around, Chen gradually monopolized the imported aviation oil market in China, increasing the company's purchasing and transportation power by taking the measures of participating in the tendering of China imported jet fuel, followed by bulk purchasing, centralized transportation and other methods.

Besides the significant improvements at CAO under Chen's leadership, the company also planned and led a series of Mergers & Acquisitions. Through these actions, Chen has set up a good example for Chinese enterprises that have the intention to venture overseas.

When Shanghai Pudong airport opened its doors in 2002, its future was still unknown. Chen purchased a 33% stake in the Aviation Fuel Supply Company of Shanghai Pudong International Airport on July 23, 2002, for a consideration of RMB370 million. This company made the profit of RMB 600 million in the second year and maintained such profit every year up to now. The return on investment to this company is still the main source of profit for CAO. On July 31, 2002, CAO acquired a stake of 5% in CLH (Spain) for 100 million Singapore Dollars. As of January 24, 2007, after the divestment of this equity, CAO gained a total of 400 million Singapore Dollars in addition to sharing profit from 3 million to 10 million per year.

In 2001, CAO negotiated with Keppel Corporation, the largest shareholder of Singapore Petroleum Company (SPC), to purchase SPC. But at that time, CAO was not strong enough to purchase SPC alone, and therefore they asked two Chinese corporations to act in concert. Unfortunately, neither of the Chinese companies cooperated and CAO had to purchase SPC alone, but the two Chinese corporations acted unfavourably, which finally led to a failed transaction when CAO had the chance to buy 77% of the stocks of SPC for S$1 per share.

On August 18, 2004, CAO announced that they had successfully bought 88 million shares of SPC (20.6% of the total equity) for S$4.12 per share, but during a shareholder's meeting this acquisition was vetoed by CAO's parent company. CAO had to pay 30 million U.S. Dollars to an Indonesian business as compensation for cancellation of the contract.

On 25 June 2009, PetroChina bought over SPC at the price of S$6.25 per share. According to a press release at that time, CAO, as a China state-controlled company, could have saved approximately 10.1 billion RMB for China if CAO's first acquisition mentioned above was successful.

Under the leadership of Chen, CAO changed from a pure oil trading business to an investment company that combines industrial, engineering, and energy trading businesses. On December 6, 2001, CAO was successfully listed on the Singapore stock exchange. In September 2004, the net asset was worth more than 150 million US Dollars, which was 852 times more than the original worth. Their market cap exceeded 1.1 billion US Dollars, which was 5022 times the initial investment from China. CAO has an excellent track record and received numerous honors, including Singapore's "most transparent" listed company twice. The development of CAO was summarized and applied as a case study for the MBA education of the National University of Singapore. It was also regarded as a successful case of a Chinese state corporation by "Qiu Shi" magazine, a core magazine of the Chinese Communist Party. In 2003, Chen Jiulin was selected as the "New Asian Leader" by the World Economic Forum (which is renamed "Young Global Leader" now) and in the same year he received the title of the "Distinguished Alumni of Peking University".

But in the first quarter of 2004, the company made losses trading options. Then, in October 2004, in an attempt to turn the tide, CAOHC, CAO's parent, which owned 75% of the stocks of CAO, decided to sell 15% of their stocks, to raise 111 million US Dollars to satisfy the demand for margin calls. The action of selling the vendor's shares was later blamed on the parent company by media and accused of concealing a public investment deficit and "insider's trading", but this also led to the imprisonment of Chen Jiulin, as he was sentenced for four years.

However, the international oil prices kept rising and losses expanded. On October 26, 2004, because of the awful pressure from Merm (Mutsui Energy Risk Management), CAOHC ordered CAO to begin closing its options positions when the oil market price was US$55.65, the highest price of the year. At the end of November, the international oil prices fell to $46.00/barrel and the average oil price was US$43/barrel for the month of December 2004. The average price of CAO's total options position was US$48/barrel. CAO should have the opportunity to gain by hedging when the market price fell below US$48/barrel. Unfortunately by that time all the options were already closed due to the pressures from the counterparties of CAO and the decision to cut loss made by CAOHC, the parent company of CAO.

One of the major reasons for CAO's loss was due to a shortage in capital, which CAOHC once firmly promised to support CAO, but some management changed the decision at the last minute. An internationally renowned agency commented that CAO could have made profit from its options position if someone supported it for only 50 million U.S. Dollars.

When CAO incident leaked out, it drew the international media's attention. In Singapore, this incident was considered the most serious financial event since the bankruptcy of Barings Bank in 1994, and once again the market debated whether the Singapore financial control authorities had a dereliction of duty. In China, this incident once again exposed the management problems of Chinese state corporations.

On June 7, 2005, five CAO executives, including Chen, were charged. A few days later, Chen was bailed out by raising 2 million Singapore Dollars (about 1.2 million U.S. Dollars). During the trial, Chen pleaded guilty to "insider trading, failure to disclose losses, making false financial statements and conspiring to deceive Deutsche Bank into handling the sale of a stake in the company in 2004".

On March 21, 2006, the subordinate court of Singapore sentenced Chen to four years and three months imprisonment and fined him for 335,000 Singapore Dollars.

Several Chinese and international business magazines and other media wrote that Chen was an "abandoned soldier", which is a terminology in the Chinese chess and has the meaning of scapegoat. Some people believe that there must be unknown inside facts about the CAO incident.

On June 22, 2010, insiders from China Gezhouba International Engineering Co., Ltd. (Gezhouba International) said that Chen will be assigned as the vice president of Gezhouba International. The Gezhouba International official website has added Chen into its management team introduction. However, the public query the qualification of Chen's serving as the vice president of a state-owned enterprise again, as the "State-owned Assets Law" claims that nationalized business' directors, supervisors and senior managements may not serve as directors, supervisors and senior management perpetually if he has caused major losses of state assets before. Obviously, Chen's almost leading to the bankruptcy of CAO belongs to "heavy losses".

== Chinese law expert oppugned Singapore Court's sentence ==
Ma Junju, Chen Jiulin's PhD professor, accepted some reporter's interview in early July, 2010, and oppugned Singapore Court's sentence.

Ma Junju is a professor at the School of Law, Tsinghua University, a distinguished professor of Southern University of Finance and Economics and he was professor and Dean of Law School in Wuhan University, professor of China University of Political Science and Law. Professor Ma is an expert in Civil Law, Commercial Law and Environmental Law.

Prof. Ma said, as far as he knows, Chen was not involved in economic crimes like encroachment of property, misappropriation of property, or sabotage of social economic order. Chen made mistakes in the process of running CAO's operations, but there was no personal motivation for the crime. Thus, what he did could not constitute a crime. Eventually, CAO succeeded in being restructured and it got through the adversity, becoming the largest China-based enterprise and the 4th largest listed company in Singapore. And this achievement has a vital link and relation to the foundation laid by Chen Jiulin. Furthermore, Chen's resignation demonstrated his loyalty to the country and his responsibility to the company.

However, Chen was sentenced to four years and three months in prison by the Singaporean Court. Prof. Ma expressed his doubts on the sentence. He said, as a Chinese civil law scholar, he does not have sufficient knowledge and is not in a position to comment on Singaporean laws and court judgment, but he has his doubts. For instance, whether an oral presentation to Deutsche Bank can be used as evidence to identify deception or whether the sale of shares of China National Aviation Fuel Corporation to save the company is fully considered as an act of a legal person. Similarly, the disclosure of the loss could only be made by the consensus of all board members. In the whole process, to what extent should Chen bear the due legal responsibility?
