= Loan credit default swap index =

Tradeable finance index

The loan credit default swap index (LCDX) is a loan-only credit default swap index created by CDS Index Company (CDSIndexCo). The LCDX index is a tradeable index with 100 equally weighted underlying single-name loan-only credit default swaps (LCDS).

== History ==
16 major financial institutions, JPMorgan, Goldman Sachs, Deutsche Bank, Barclays Capital, Bank of America, BNP Paribas, Citigroup, Credit Suisse, Lehman Brothers, Merrill Lynch, RBS Greenwich, UBS and Wachovia, owned the private company called the CDS Index Company (CDS IndexCo), that developed the ABX index on 17 January 2006.

Markit Group Limited marketed the ABX index and by 2007 had acquired (CDS IndexCo). On 17 The ABX index was a credit default swap of asset-backed mortgages of 30 of the most liquid mortgage-backed bonds. Hedge funds began shorting that ABX index in early 2006 at par. The Deutsche Bank, alone, reportedly made $250 million.(Lenzner 2007)

== Recognition ==
Forbes journalist described the creation of the index as just-in-time financial engineering. The LCDX provided protection for banks and hedge fund clients from the overly leveraged loan market.(Lenzner 2007)

Stephen Waugh, a vice president at Deutsche Bank, announced the launch of Markit's first tranched "long-awaited" and "highly anticipated" loan credit default swap index (LCDX). Citigroup claimed it had been quoted on the market since the summer of 2007.(Stein 2007)

== See also ==
- Credit derivative
- Credit default swap
