= Coco and Igor =

2002 novel by Chris Greenhalgh

- First edition
- Author: Chris Greenhalgh
- Language: English
- Genre: Historical fiction
- Publisher: Headline Review
- Publication date: 1 July 2002
- Publication place: United Kingdom
- Media type: Print (hardcover)
- Pages: 311pp (first edition, HB)
- ISBN: 0-7553-0086-6 (first edition, HB)
- OCLC: 49394049

Coco and Igor is a 2002 novel by Chris Greenhalgh. Set mainly in Paris in 1920, it is based on the real-life affair between Coco Chanel and Igor Stravinsky.

== Plot summary ==
Stravinsky's The Rite of Spring has its Paris premiere on 29 May 1913. Coco is mesmerised by the power of Igor's composition, but the audience is scandalised by its discordant, rhythmic music and Nijinsky's primitive choreography.

Coco finally meets Igor seven years later, at a dinner hosted by Sergei Diaghilev, impresario of the Ballets Russes. Igor has been forced to flee Russia – with his wife and four children – following the Russian Revolution. Coco invites him to bring his family to stay with her at her villa in Garches – 'Bel Respiro'.

Couturière and composer soon begin an affair. Both experience a surge of creativity; while Coco creates Chanel No. 5 (with perfumer Ernest Beaux), Igor's compositions display a new, liberated style. But Igor's wife, Katerina, becomes ill with consumption and an unbearable tension takes hold of 'Bel Respiro' and its occupants.

== Structure ==
The piano keyboard operates as a framework for the novel. There are eighty-eight chapters, corresponding to the number of keys on a piano.

== Reviews ==
- Coco and Igor, Review at Vogue (11 June 2002)
- "Eau de rancour" by Peter Conrad, The Observer (30 June 2002)
- "Books: Coco Chanel & Igor Stravinsky" by Stephanie Green, The Washington Post (6 December 2009)

== Film adaptation ==
Greenhalgh adapted his novel for the 2009 film Coco Chanel & Igor Stravinsky, directed by Jan Kounen and starring Anna Mouglalis and Mads Mikkelsen. The film was selected to occupy the prestigious closing slot at the 2009 Cannes Film Festival on 24 May 2009. The riotous premiere of The Rite of Spring at the Théâtre des Champs-Élysées on 29 May 1913 is legendary (see: The Rite of Spring#Premiere).

== Historical context ==
In the spring of 1920, Chanel was introduced to Stravinsky by Sergei Diaghilev, impresario of the Ballets Russes. During the summer, Chanel discovered that the Stravinsky family was seeking a place to live. She invited them to "Bel Respiro" until they could find a more suitable residence (they arrived in the second week of September and stayed until May 1921). Chanel also guaranteed the 1920 Ballets Russes production of The Rite of Spring against financial loss with an anonymous gift to Diaghilev, said to be 300,000 francs.

The personal relationships depicted in the novel are largely fictionalised. Stravinsky was reputed to have been a philanderer who had several affairs, including one with Chanel. Whereas Stravinsky never publicly referred to this alleged affair, Chanel spoke about it at length to her biographer Paul Morand in 1946 (the conversation was published thirty years later as l'Allure de Chanel). The accuracy of Chanel's claims has been disputed both by Stravinsky's second wife, Vera, and by his close musical collaborator, Robert Craft. The Chanel fashion house avers there is no evidence that any affair between Chanel and Stravinsky ever occurred.

== Editions ==
=== English ===
- UK hardback: Headline Review, 1 July 2002 (ISBN 0-7553-0086-6)
- UK paperback: Headline Review, 7 July 2003 (ISBN 978-0755300877)
- US trade paperback: Riverhead Books (an imprint of Penguin USA), 1 December 2009 (ISBN 978-1594484551)

=== Translations ===
Coco and Igor has been translated into several languages, including:

- French: 'Coco et Igor' – Calmann-Levy, 8 April 2009, translated by Elsa Maggion (ISBN 978-2702139813)
- Russian: 'Villa Bel Respiro' – Symposium, 1 June 2009 (ISBN 978-8-87-4966851)
- Polish: 'Coco i Igor' – Wydawnictwo Amber, 2002, translated by Barbara Przbylowska (ISBN 83-241-0170-5)
- Greek: 'Coco and Igor' – Empeiria, November 2003, translated by Persa Koumoutsi (ISBN 960-417-044-9)
- Chinese: 'Coco and Igor' – Sun Color Culture Publishing Co. Ltd, October 2009 (ISBN 978-9862291764)
