= ODS-Petrodata =

- Parent company: IHS Inc.
- Status: Acquired By IHS Inc.
- Founded: 2002
- Country of origin: UK, United States, Norway
- Headquarters location: Oslo, Aberdeen, Houston
- Key people: Per Christian Grytnes (President and CEO)
- No. of employees: 100-200
- Official website: www.ods-petrodata.com

ODS-Petrodata is a market intelligence company specialised in the upstream offshore oil and gas industry. ODS-Petrodata is considered an authoritative source for market intelligence, data, market research and consulting services. "ODS-Petrodata has been a leading provider of market intelligence and data to the offshore oil and gas industry [by association with its previous entities], since 1974"

== History ==
ODS-Petrodata was founded in 2002 from the merger of Offshore Data Services Inc., Petrodata Ltd. and Bassoe Offshore Consultants Ltd., each a provider of "data, information and market intelligence to the offshore energy industry". ODS-Petrodata's website claims that their organisation has existed in some form since 1973. In the recent years, they also starting producing tools and publications oriented towards the offshore renewables market.

== Locations ==
ODS-Petrodata operates from offices in Houston, Aberdeen, Oslo, Singapore and Dubai.

== Acquisition ==
ODS-Petrodata was acquired by IHS Inc. in April 2011.
