= Coco Chanel & Igor Stravinsky =

- Directed by: Jan Kounen
- Written by: Carlo de Boutiny; Jan Kounen
- Based on: Coco & Igor by Chris Greenhalgh
- Produced by: Chris Bolzli; Claudie Ossard; Veronika Zonabend
- Starring: Anna Mouglalis; Mads Mikkelsen
- Cinematography: David Ungaro
- Edited by: Anne Danché
- Music by: Gabriel Yared
- Distributed by: Wild Bunch Distribution (France)
- Release dates: 24 May 2009 (Cannes); 30 December 2009 (France)
- Running time: 118 minutes
- Country: France
- Languages: French; Russian; English
- Budget: $12 million
- Box office: $6.2 million

Coco Chanel, 1920

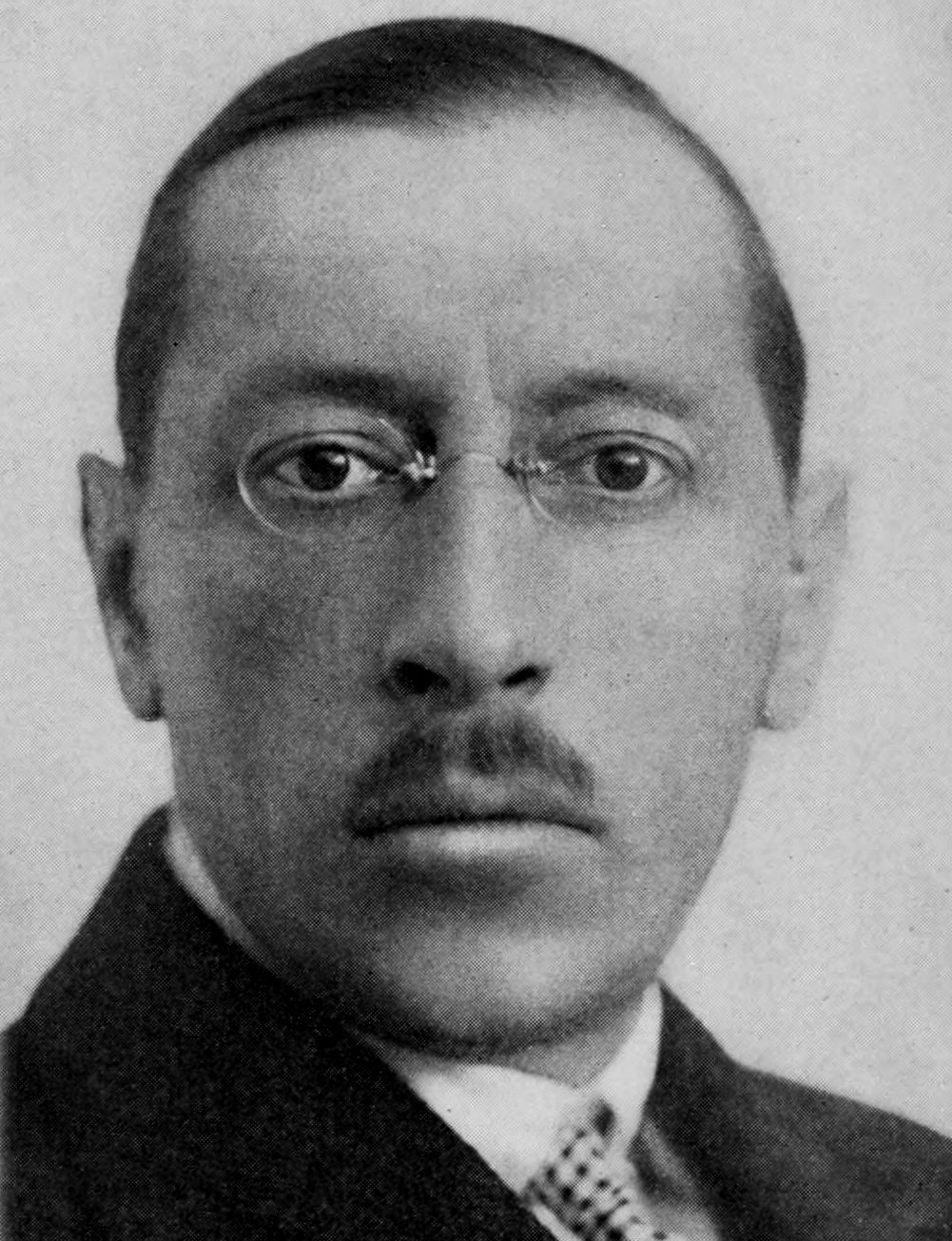
Igor Stravinsky, 1921

Coco Chanel & Igor Stravinsky is a 2009 French romantic drama film directed by Jan Kounen. It was chosen as the Closing Film of the 2009 Cannes Film Festival, and was shown on 24 May 2009.

Coco Chanel & Igor Stravinsky is based on the 2002 fictional novel Coco and Igor by Chris Greenhalgh and traces a rumoured affair between Coco Chanel and Igor Stravinsky in Paris in 1920, the year that Chanel No. 5 was created. Greenhalgh also wrote the screenplay for the film. Chanel and its former chief designer Karl Lagerfeld lent their support to the production; they granted access to the company's archives and to Coco Chanel's apartment at 31, rue Cambon, Paris.

== Plot ==
An introductory scene takes place in Paris in 1913, where Coco Chanel attends the first, scandalous performance of Igor Stravinsky's The Rite of Spring. The rhythmic and harmonic dissonance of the score and the surprising choreography of the piece result in heckling and outrage among much of the audience. But Chanel is impressed by Stravinsky and his music.

Seven years later, Chanel and Stravinsky meet again. Although her business has flourished, Chanel is mourning the death of her lover, Arthur "Boy" Capel. Stravinsky has chosen to flee to France following the Russian Revolution. An immediate sympathy and attraction occurs between the couturière and the composer.

Chanel invites Stravinsky to live in her villa outside Paris, along with his ailing wife and their children. The summer months that follow see Chanel and Stravinsky begin an affair, one which Stravinsky's wife cannot avoid becoming aware of. Tensions between Stravinsky and his wife, and between Stravinsky's wife and Chanel, are unavoidable.

The film implies that the affair, and the later termination of the affair by Chanel, has a major influence on the lives of both Chanel and Stravinsky. It is during this time that Chanel creates Chanel No. 5 with her perfumer, Ernest Beaux, and that Stravinsky begins to compose in a new, more liberated style. During his time at the villa, he works hard on a revision of The Rite of Spring. One of the last scenes of the movie shows the revival of the ballet, with new choreography, and this time, shows that it was an artistic triumph and recognized as a masterpiece.

== Cast ==
- Mads Mikkelsen as Igor Stravinsky
- Anna Mouglalis as Coco Chanel
- Elena Morozova as Catherine Stravinsky
- Natacha Lindinger as Misia Sert
- Grigori Manoukov as Sergei Diaghilev
- Rasha Bukvic as Grand Duke Dmitri
- Erick Demarestz as The Doctor
- Nicolas Vaude as Ernest Beaux
- Anatole Taubman as Boy Capel
- Maxime Danielou as Theodore
- Sophie Hasson as Ludmila
- Nikita Ponomarenko as Soulima Stravinsky
- Clara Guelblum as Milene
- Olivier Claverie as Joseph
- Catherine Davenier as Marie
- Marek Kossakowski as Vaslav Nijinsky
- Jérôme Pillement as Pierre Monteux
- David Tomaszewski as Principal Violinist
- Marek Tomaszewski as Pianist
- Anton Yakovlev as Piotr
- Irina Vavilova as The Governess
- Julie Farenc Deramond as Julie the salesgirl
- Emy Levy and Sarah Jérôme as Workshop girls
- Tina Sportolaro as Beaux's secretary
- Michel Ruhl as The Baron
- Pierre Chidyvar, Agnès Vikouloff and Sacha Vikouloff as Russian musicians
- David Baschung as The Doctor
- Cyril Accorsi, Matthieu Bajolet, Caroline Baudouin, Bruno Benne, Jonathan Ber, Laura Biasse, Barbara Caillieu, Marie-Laure Caradec, Damien Dreux, Sophie Gérard, Patrick Harlay, Inès Hernandez, Anne Laurent, Thibaud Le Maguer, Anne Lenglet, Olivier Normand, Florent Otello, Edouard Pelleray, Judith Perron, Pascal Queneau, Enora Rivère, Julie Salgues, Jonathan Schatz, Wu Zheng (dancers in The Rite of Spring)

== Reception ==
Reviews were mixed. Stephen Holden of The New York Times said the film was "cool, elegant and sexy…. But the film … never regains that initial blast of energy and the final scenes wobble toward a wishy-washy ending." Writing for DVD Talk, Casey Burchby praises the "extraordinarily bold" opening sequence that recreates the Paris premiere of Stravinsky's The Rite of Spring.

Modestas Mankus from Our Culture Mag gave the film 3/5 stars saying "stumbled through its unclear presentation but gave us a look into the world of two greats."

== Historical context ==
The riotous premiere of The Rite of Spring at the Théâtre des Champs-Élysées on 29 May 1913 is legendary (see: The Rite of Spring#Premiere).

In the spring of 1920, Chanel was introduced to Stravinsky by Sergei Diaghilev, impresario of the Ballets Russes. During the summer, Chanel discovered that the Stravinsky family was seeking a place to live. She invited them to her new home, "Bel Respiro," in the Paris suburb of Garches until they could find a more suitable residence. They arrived at "Bel Respiro" during the second week of September and remained until May 1921. Chanel also guaranteed the 1920 Ballets Russes production of The Rite of Spring against financial loss with an anonymous gift to Diaghilev, said to be 300,000 francs.

The personal relationships depicted in the film are largely fictionalized. Stravinsky was reputed to have been a philanderer who had several affairs, including one with Chanel. Whereas Stravinsky never publicly referred to this alleged affair, Chanel spoke about it at length to her biographer Paul Morand in 1946 (the conversation was published thirty years later as l'Allure de Chanel). The accuracy of Chanel's claims has been disputed both by Stravinsky's second wife, Vera, and by his close musical collaborator, Robert Craft. The Chanel fashion house avers there is no evidence that any affair between Chanel and Stravinsky ever occurred.

== See also ==
- Coco Before Chanel, 2009 film by Anne Fontaine
