= Constant proportion debt obligation =

A Constant proportion debt obligation (CPDO) is a type of credit derivative sold to investors looking for exposure to credit risk. A CPDO is normally embedded in a note rated by a credit rating agency. CPDOs employ dynamic leveraging in a similar (but opposite) way to Credit CPPI trades.

CPDOs are formed first by creating a SPV that issues a debt note. The SPV invests in an index of debt securities, commonly credit default swap indices such as CDX and iTraxx (in theory, this could be deal-specific, such as a bespoke portfolio of sovereign debt), similar to a CDO. The structure allows for continual adjustment of leverage such that the asset and liability spreads stay matched. In general this involves increasing leverage as when losses are taken, similar to a doubling strategy, in which one doubles one's bet at each coin toss until a win occurs.

The investment index is periodically rolled, whereby the SPV must sell protection on the new index and buy back protection on the old index. In doing so, it incurs rollover risk, in that the leaving index may by priced much wider than the new index.

== Initial reaction ==
The first CPDO deal was issued in 2006 by ABN-AMRO and was rated AAA/Aaa. Many analysts were initially skeptical of the rating assigned, partly because the CPDO note paid interest of Libor plus 200bp but also since the deal contained a majority of market risk (spread risk) rather than credit risk - an exposure not normally rated by rating agencies. They also indicated that future deals would be highly unlikely to achieve the same rating with the same spread. Fitch Ratings in April 2007 released a report warning the market on the constant proportion debt obligations (CPDO) dangers.

Later CPDOs had more conservative structures and were offered at AAA/Aaa with a much lower spread.

Financial Times reported on May 21, 2008 that an investigation by FT has discovered that Moody's awarded incorrect triple-A ratings to billions of dollars' worth of a type of complex debt product due to a bug in its computer models. Internal Moody's documents seen by the FT show that some senior staff within the credit agency knew early in 2007 that products rated the previous year had received top-notch triple A ratings and that, after a computer coding error was corrected, their ratings should have been up to four notches lower.

== Credit crunch ==
The sudden widening of credit spreads that occurred in 2007 and 2008 as a result of the credit crunch caused considerable losses to the net asset value of many CPDOs. The rating agencies that had entered the CPDO rating business have downgraded many of them and some have already defaulted.

The failures of these highly rated notes has been used by critics in criticisms of the rating agencies, although not all agencies have rated them and some agencies had provided the market with early pre-crisis warnings.
