= ABX =

ABX may refer to:

- ABX Air, an American cargo airline
- ABX test, a double-blind testing method used in codec listening tests and in ascertaining high fidelity
- ABX (TV channel), a French-language TV channel in Belgium
- Abaknon language, an Austronesian language of the Philippines
- Albury Airport in New South Wales, Australia (IATA code ABX)
- Barrick Gold, from its TSX and NYSE stock symbol
- Antibiotics, antibacterial medications
- Asset-backed securities index, a list of exposures used for benchmarking or trading
- ABX diagnostics, a medical device manufacturer acquired by Horiba
