= Adrian Politowski =

Swedish independent film producer

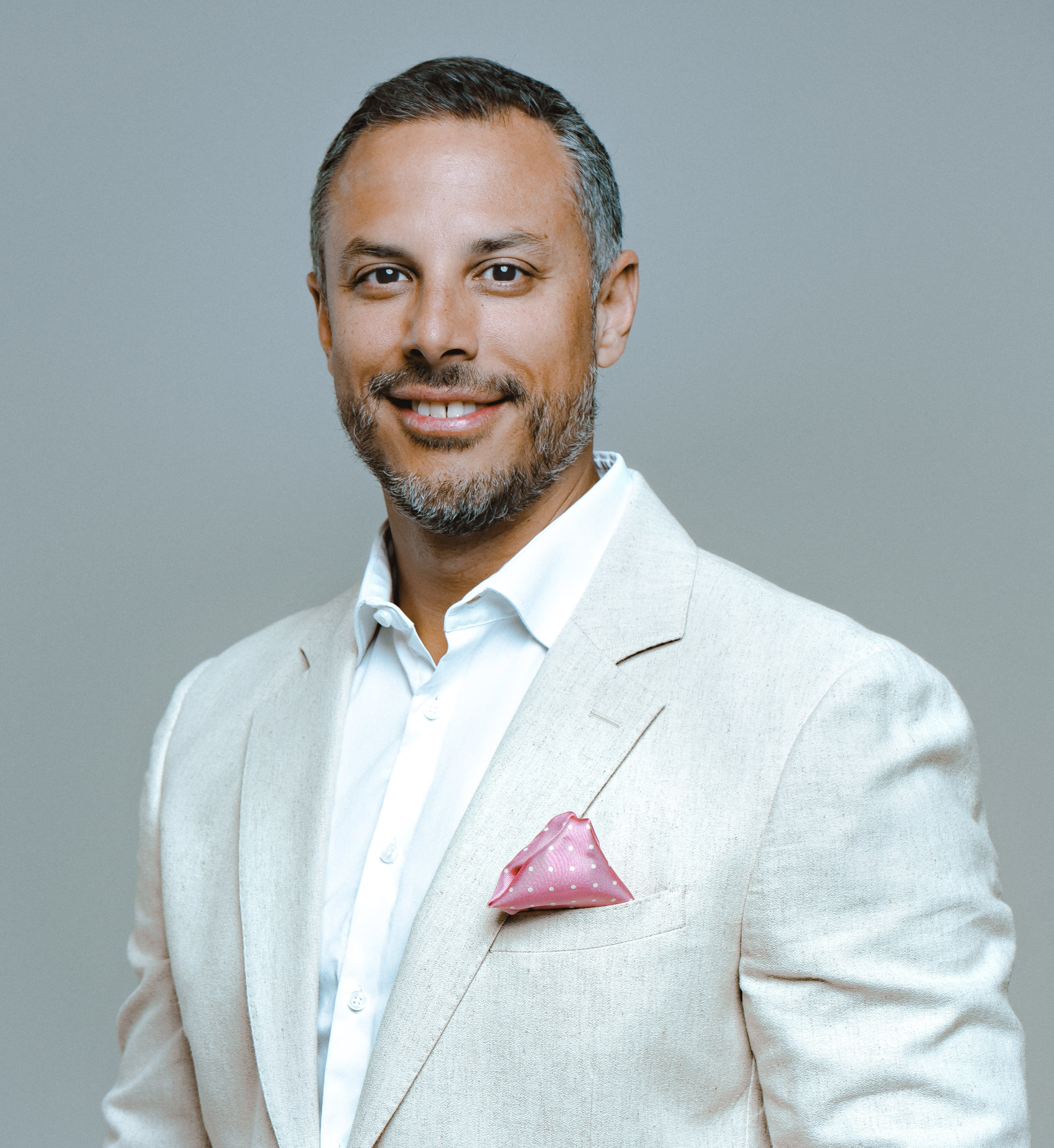
- Born: Adrian Murshid; October 1978 (age 48); Stockholm, Sweden
- Education: University of Oxford
- Occupations: Entrepreneur; film producer; businessman
- Years active: 2004–present
- Known for: Umedia; Align Pictures
- Spouse: Nadia Khamlichi (divorced)
- Partner: Amanda Gyllensparv (2020-present)
- Children: 1

Adrian Politowski né Murshid (born October 1978) is a Swedish film producer, fund manager, and entrepreneur. He co-founded and was CEO of Umedia from 2004 to 2019. He currently is the executive chairman of the production and financing group Align that he co-founded and ran as CEO (2019–2024). His career is focused on three areas:

- Entrepreneurship as a co-founder and CEO of both Umedia and Align, as well as board of director member of Goodbye Kansas Group (listed at NASDAQ First North) and the health-tech startup Nordic Executive Medicine.
- Media with 500 film & TV productions credited as producer
- Finance with €650M ($730M) raised, managed and deployed in media financing

He has produced and financed films such as the five-time Academy Awards winner The Artist (2011), Good Luck to You, Leo Grande (2022) (Four-time nominated at BAFTA and premiered at Sundance Film 2022), Grace of Monaco (2014) starring Nicole Kidman, (Official Selection and opening film of the 2014 Cannes Film Festival), Mandy (2018) starring Nicolas Cage that premiered on Sundance Film Festival 2018, Paws of Fury: The Legend of Hank (2022) starring Samuel L Jackson, Michael Cera and Ricky Gervais, animation feature Little Nicholas: Happy As Can Be (2022). that premièred as the Official Selection at Cannes Film Festival 2022, won the Cristal Award at Annecy Animation Film Festival, and was nominated for an Annie Award for Best Independent Feature Film and The Pod Generation (2023) starring Emilia Clarke and Chiwetel Ejiofor and premiered in Sundance Film Festival (2023). He also produced the HBO TV series My Brilliant Friend.

== Personal life ==
Politowski was born in Stockholm, Sweden. His birth name is Murshid, and he is of Polish and Bangladeshi descent. On the paternal side, he is the grandson of Nurjahan Murshid and Khan Sarwar Murshid. On the maternal side, he is the grandson of Mieczyslaw Politowski.

Politowski attended Oxford University / Somerville College from 1996, receiving a Master of Engineering in 2000 (First Class). Staying on at University of Oxford (St. Peter's College), he obtained his second Master's aged 23 - a Master of Philosophy in Economics in 2002.

Politowski married fellow producer Nadia Khamlichi. Together with his ex-wife, they have one son, born 2012. Adrian is currently with Swedish model/influencer Amanda Gyllensparv. He "currently splits his time between Los Angeles, Brussels and Stockholm".

== Career ==
Politowski and his partners Nadia Khamlichi (his ex-wife) and Jeremy Burdek founded Motion Investment Group in 2004 in Brussels, Belgium. In 2010, the group rebranded as Umedia (formerly stylized uMedia), with business divisions of "uFund (fundraising), uFilm (production and investment), uDream (distribution) and uFX (visual effects)."

At his departure from Umedia, the group had grown into a $100M+ turnover international production group with 200 staff. From 2004 onto 2020, it had raised and financed over $630M, produced over 400films and its VFX division has grown into the largest in Benelux.

In 2019, Politowski and Khamlichi co-founded and launched the production company Align, resigned as CEO and sold his remaining stake in Umedia in 2020.

In 2025, Screen revealed that it had raised a new $120M fund to be deployed over coming years in film & tv productions.

Politowski is currently on the board of directors of the gaming/VFX company and tech group Goodbye Kansas since 2022 (publicly traded on NASDAQ First North), is a member of the advisory board of WIFTI (Women in Film and TV International) and is Chairman of Nordic Executive Medicine.

== Selected filmography ==
Year	Title	Role	Notes	Refs
2008	Asterix at the Olympic Games	Co-producer		
2010	Outside the Law	Co-producer		
2011	Artist	Co-producer		
2011	A Monster in Paris	Co-producer		
2012	Erased	Producer		
2012	What's in a Name?	Co-producer		
2012	Blancanieves	Executive producer		
2013	Jack and the Cuckoo-Clock Heart	Co-producer		
2013	Me, Myself and Mum	Co-producer		
2014	Grace of Monaco	Co-producer		
2014	La Famille Bélier	Co-producer		
2014	Yves Saint-Laurent	Co-producer		
2017	Le Brio	Co-producer		
2017	Revenge	Co-producer		
2017	Journey's End	Executive Producer		
2017	What Happened to Monday	Co-producer		
2017	I Kill Giants	Producer		
2018	Swimming with Men	Executive Producer		
2018	Mandy	Producer		
2019	Guns Akimbo	Executive Producer		
2019	Le Belle Epoque	Co-producer		
2019	Fisherman's Friends	Executive Producer		
2019	Extra Ordinary	Executive Producer		
2019	The Mustang	Producer		
2018–2020	My Brilliant Friend	Co-producer	TV series, seasons 1-2	
2020	Rogue City	Executive Producer		
2020	Blithe Spirit	Producer		
2022	Paws of Fury: The Legend of Hank	Executive Producer		
2022	Good Luck to You, Leo Grande	Producer		
2022	Little Nicholas: Happy As Can Be	Producer		
2023	The Pod Generation	Executive Producer		
2023	The Inventor	Producer		
2024	Magpie (film)	Executive Producer		
2024	Sting (film)	Executive Producer		
2024	Kensuke's Kingdom (film)	Producer		
2025	Jimpa	Executive Producer		
2025	The Thing with Feathers (film)	Executive Producer		
