= Arash Amel =

Welsh-Iranian screenwriter, graphic novelist and producer. (born 1976)

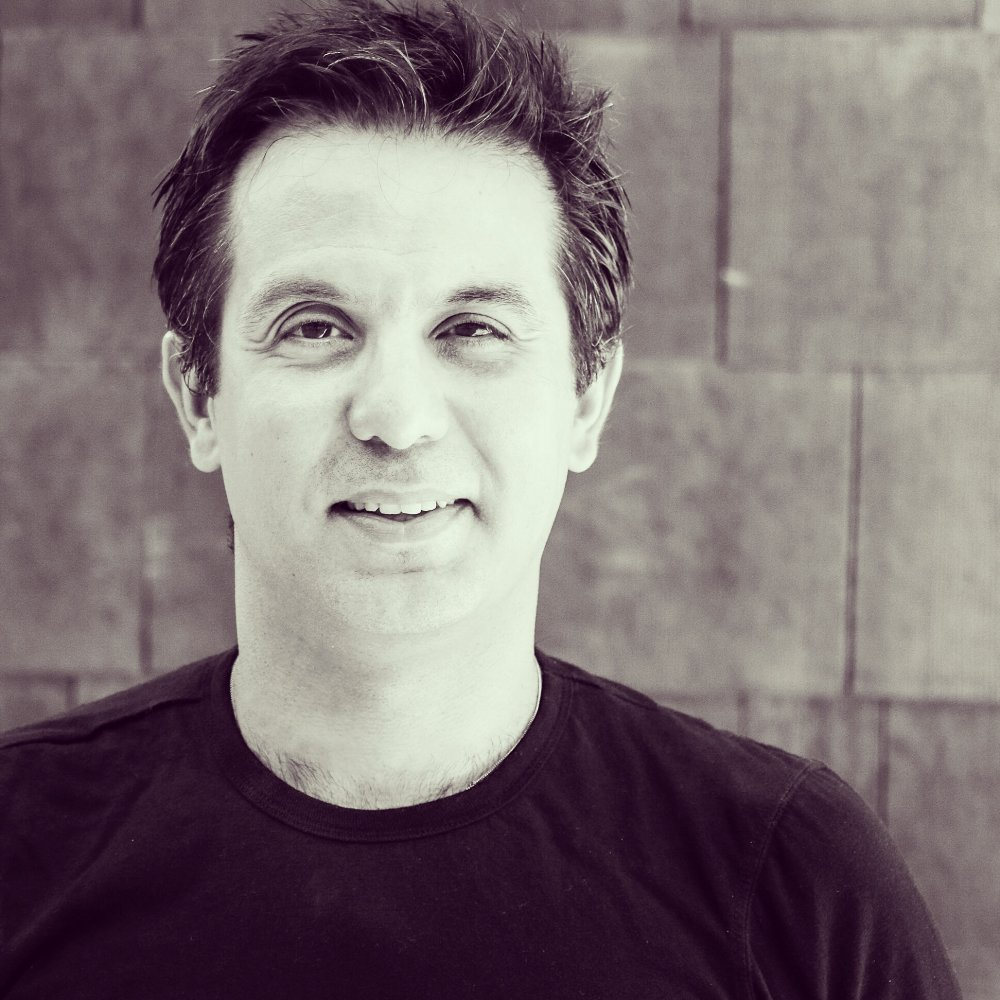
- Amel in 2016
- Born: 1976 (age 49–50); Aberystwyth, Wales
- Occupations: Screenwriter, producer

Arash Amel (Persian: آرش عامل) (born 1976) is a Welsh-Iranian screenwriter, graphic novelist and producer. He is the screenwriter of A Private War and The Ministry of Ungentlemanly Warfare, and the creator of two graphic novels, including Butterfly, on which the Amazon MGM Studios series of the same name is based.

== Early life ==
Amel was born in Aberystwyth, Wales in 1976, but spent several years in Iran before emigrating to the UK as a child. He subsequently moved to Los Angeles, California. While in the UK, he qualified as a Barrister and was a leading media analyst at Screen Digest.

== Career ==
Amel was named one of Screen International's British Stars of Tomorrow in 2013.

=== The Ministry of Ungentlemanly Warfare ===
In February 2021, Guy Ritchie signed on to direct a World War II film based on Amel's screenplay The Ministry of Ungentlemanly Warfare, based on the book by Damien Lewis, for producer Jerry Bruckheimer and Paramount Pictures. In October 2022, Henry Cavill and Eiza González were cast in the lead roles, with filming to begin in early 2023, but with Paramount no longer involved.

=== Rise ===
Amel wrote the Giannis Antetokounmpo biopic Rise for Disney, released on Disney Plus in June 2022. On the review aggregator website Rotten Tomatoes, 95% of 21 critics' reviews are positive, with an average rating of 7.10/10. On Metacritic, the film has a weighted average score of 74 out of 100 based on reviews from 5 critics, indicating "generally favorable reviews". Gary Goldstein in The Los Angeles Times wrote, "When it comes to inspirational sports movies, the true-life tale 'Rise' proves a slam dunk." The New York Times chose the movie as its critic's pick, with Calum Marsh stating, "The story of the real-life N.B.A. superstar Giannis Antetokounmpo is told with heartfelt charm in this endearing Disney+ biopic."

In August 2022, it became the first Disney Plus Original Movie to launch across the entire Disney Streaming Bundle, including Disney Plus, Hulu and ESPN Plus.

=== A Private War ===
Amel wrote and co-produced A Private War, the American biographical drama of slain war journalist Marie Colvin, starring Rosamund Pike and Jamie Dornan. The film was directed by Matthew Heineman. Amel was first announced on the project on 13 April 2013, adapting the 2012 article "Marie Colvin's Private War" in Vanity Fair by Marie Brenner.

The film had its world premiere at the 2018 Toronto International Film Festival on 7 September 2018, and screened at the Mill Valley Film Festival on 4 October 2018, and the Woodstock Film Festival on 14 October 2018. The film was released on 2 November 2018, in a limited release, before expanding wide on 16 November 2018. It has an approval rating of 89% based on 91 reviews, and the average score is 7.3/10 on Rotten Tomatoes. The critics consensus reads "A Private War honors its real-life subject with a sober appraisal of the sacrifices required of journalists on the front lines - and career-best work by Rosamund Pike."

=== Grace of Monaco ===
Amel wrote and produced the controversial Princess Grace period drama Grace of Monaco, starring Nicole Kidman, Tim Roth and Frank Langella, and directed by Olivier Dahan. The script was listed in the 2011 Black List of the most liked Hollywood screenplays written in that year. The film opened the 2014 Cannes Film Festival, where it was heavily criticised. Harvey Weinstein, whose company owns the distribution rights to Grace of Monaco, was absent from the Cannes premier of the movie. Weinstein was said to have been doing charity work with his wife Georgina Chapman. Weinstein stated that the director's cut of the film was missing a key scene that would address the "legitimate concerns" raised by the royal family over the depiction in Dahan's film. In January 2015, Harvey Weinstein clarified the events leading to his conflict with the director, praising the screenplay and indicating that the US release will be a "Writer's Cut", restoring the movie to the spirit of the screenplay The Weinstein Company signed on for, which he compared to The King's Speech. He said, "The writer, Arash Amel, called me and said, what happened to my script. It's like welcome to Hollywood. Writers don't have any say, but we decided to pair him up with a team of people and see what he could do about restoring the movie to the way it looked when he wrote it. He did a wonderful job." Though Amel never publicly took a side in the long-running feud over final cut, he refused to attend the film's official photo call and press conference at the Cannes Film Festival for the director's cut being screened.

Amel's script was also criticised by the Royal Family of Monaco for being "farcical" and for bearing "no relation to reality." The Prince's Palace released a statement stating, "The Princely Family does not in any way wish to be associated with this film which reflects no reality and regrets that its history has been misappropriated for purely commercial purposes." Mark Kermode in The Guardian wrote, "The biggest problem is Arash Amel's script, which asks us to side with tax evaders and gamblers (Monaco did indeed incur a French blockade for tax-sheltering their billionaires), and to imagine that there is something beautiful and noble about allowing companies to shirk their revenue responsibilities. (Presumably the forthcoming DVD will be heavily promoted on Amazon?)". Kermode's review of Olivier Dahan's film was directly rebutted in a long defense of the movie by critic Brad Stevens in the British Film Institute's film magazine Sight & Sound, stating "The critical condescension that met Olivier Dahan's Grace of Monaco biopic shows tastemakers still struggling with 'feminine' cinema."

Amel was nominated for an Emmy for Outstanding Television Movie for Grace of Monaco in 2015.

=== Other notable work ===
Amel created the BOOM! Studios comic book series Butterfly. It was launched in September 2014 to positive reviews, and was subsequently acquired by Amazon to be adapted into a television series. Amazon gave the show a series order in May 2023 starring Daniel Dae Kim. It premiered on Prime Video on August 13, 2025. Amel also executive produced the series.

Amel penned the Jackie Chan and John Cena film Hidden Strike, released on Netflix on 28 July 2023.

Amel is adapting for the screen and producing Chris Greenhalgh's epic love story Seducing Ingrid Bergman, in partnership with Uday Chopra and YRF Entertainment. The novel was published in the UK in 2012 and in the US in 2014. Amel's adaptation was listed in the 2014 Hollywood Black List of the most liked screenplays. The film is to be directed by James Mangold.

On 14 August 2013, Universal Pictures announced its acquisition of Amel's science fiction screenplay Soldiers of the Sun as the beginning of a new action franchise starring Vin Diesel. The project will be produced by Lorenzo di Bonaventura, Vin Diesel, and Samantha Vincent.

Amel's first credit was the Aaron Eckhart thriller Erased, which opened to mostly bad reviews. Amel also wrote the sequel to I Am Legend for Warner Bros. Akiva Goldsman announced in 2014 that the sequel had been scrapped and the studio is rebooting the franchise.

== Filmography ==
Year	Title	Writer	Producer
2012	Erased	Yes	No
2014	Grace of Monaco	Yes	Yes
2018	The Titan	Story	Yes
2018	A Private War	Yes	Co-producer
2021	Outside the Wire	No	Yes
2022	Rise	Yes	No
2023	Hidden Strike	Yes	No
2024	The Ministry of Ungentlemanly Warfare	Yes	No

== Television ==
Year	Title	Writer	Producer
2025	Butterfly	Yes	Yes
