= Debt obligation =

Debt obligation may refer to:

- Collateralized debt obligation
- Constant Proportion Debt Obligation
