= Erased (2012 film) =

Erased (The Expatriate)
- Theatrical release poster
- Directed by: Philipp Stölzl
- Written by: Arash Amel
- Produced by: Karl Richards; Adrian Politowski; Jonathan Vanger
- Starring: Aaron Eckhart; Olga Kurylenko; Liana Liberato
- Cinematography: Kolja Brandt
- Edited by: Dominique Fortin
- Music by: Jeff Danna
- Production companies: E-Motion; Informant Films Europe; uMedia
- Distributed by: RADiUS-TWC
- Release dates: 21 September 2012 (Belgium); 31 May 2013 (Canada)
- Running time: 104 minutes
- Countries: Canada; Belgium
- Language: English
- Box office: $1.3 million

Erased (released as The Expatriate outside of the US) is a 2012 action thriller film directed by Philipp Stölzl, starring Aaron Eckhart and Olga Kurylenko. The story centers on Ben Logan (Aaron Eckhart) an ex-CIA agent and Amy (Liana Liberato), his estranged daughter who are forced on the run when his employers erase all records of his existence, and mark them both for termination as part of a wide-reaching international conspiracy. It was released in the US on 17 May 2013, following its acquisition by RADiUS-TWC, the multiplatform distribution label of The Weinstein Company. It was retitled Erased for the US market.

== Plot ==
Ben Logan is an American single parent who has recently moved to Belgium with Amy, his previously estranged teenaged daughter. He works for The Kohler Company, a subsidiary within the Halgate Group, a multinational technology corporation.

He tests ways to breach security measures, such as locks and iris scanners. When one of his co-workers discovers that the company does not have a patent for one of its products, Logan brings it to the attention of his boss, Derek Kohler. Shortly afterward, he finds his entire office building is empty and no records exist of the Kohler Company nor his employment. Confused, Logan attempts to prove his employment by accessing bank records, but then he and Amy are kidnapped at gunpoint by Logan's coworker Floyd, who forces them into Logan's car.

Logan crashes the car on purpose and then kills Floyd in front of a stunned Amy and the pair flee from the police. They break into an empty house and Amy demands to know Logan's background. Logan cryptically alludes to "getting people in and out of difficult situations". Logan soon discovers that the rest of his coworkers have all been killed, and he goes into hiding, aided by Amy's contacts among Algerian illegal immigrant she had befriended. Eventually, Logan uncovers documents proving a wide-ranging conspiracy involving illegal arms trafficking to African insurgents, meant to allow Halgate to access lithium mining rights when the insurgents take power. The Halgate shell company Logan was working for was using his security engineering skills to steal these documents from a CIA cache. Logan finally tells Amy that he is an ex-CIA operative.

Logan and Amy are hunted by the CIA, Belgian police, and an assassin hired by Halgate. The CIA team is led by Anna Brandt, Logan's former lover, who is also on the Halgate payroll, and who recommended him to the shell company for his security engineering skills.

After repeated failed attempts to capture Logan, they meet and he convinces her that she has lost her moral compass. Brandt aligns herself with him and tries to help him. Amy is captured by the assassin and Brandt is killed trying to save her.

Logan goes after his corrupt former employers and arranges to deliver himself and the documents, in exchange for Amy's life. He makes homemade explosives and a trigger mechanism and puts them in a briefcase. He is able to say goodbye to Amy before he trades the briefcase to Halgate and his assistant, watching her leave with her Algerian friend Nabil. Halgate tells the assassin that Amy and her grandfather, her only other family member, must be killed in a week. Seconds later Halgate, his assistant, and the assassin are killed by the bomb hidden in the briefcase with the documents. Logan and Amy reunite at the airport.

== Cast ==
- Aaron Eckhart as ex-CIA Black ops Ben Logan
- Liana Liberato as his teenage daughter Amy Logan
- Olga Kurylenko as CIA operative Anna Brandt
- Neil Napier as CIA operative Derek Kohler (he also uses the alias Markus Wolf)
- Kate Linder as Principal Gibbins
- Alexander Fehling as Floyd
- Garrick Hagon as James Halgate III, a company executive
- Eric Godon as Maitland
- Simone-Élise Girard as Halgate's receptionist
- David Bark-Jones as Marty Braemer
- Debbie Wong as Mei Ling, one of Ben's co-workers
- Jade Hassouné as Abdi
- Nick Alachiotis as Walter Smet
- Achille Ridolfi as Karim's Bodyguard
- Carlo Mestroni as Field Officer
- Yassine Fadel as Nabil, Amy's boyfriend

== Release ==
Erased made its United States theatrical premiere on 17 May 2013.

== Reception ==
Rotten Tomatoes reports a 28% approval rating, based on 46 critical reviews, and the average rating was 4.73/10; the website's critics consensus reads: "Derivative to a fault, Erased squanders some nifty potential and its talented cast in a bland retelling of a story action fans have seen too many times before." Metacritic rated the film 34/100 based on 17 reviews. Dennis Harvey of Variety called it "a confidently engineered, propulsive piece of intelligent action cinema." Frank Scheck of The Hollywood Reporter called it "competent but uninspired". Robert Abele of the Los Angeles Times called it unoriginal and clichéd. Paul Bradshaw of Total Film wrote, "Eckhart makes a decent Damon stand-in, but there's nothing here than hasn't been done (better) before."

The script was heavily criticised for being what many reviewers felt was "unoriginal." Michael Posner of The Globe and Mail said "Arash Amel’s plot is a hodgepodge of threadbare motifs, liberally cut and pasted from every thriller you’ve seen." Jeannette Catsoulis of The New York Times agreed, saying "We have a script, by Arash Amel, that hustles cardboard characters from one crisis to the next, pausing only to leak lines that might have been clipped from a compendium of spy movie clichés."
