= Lloyd's Register =

Technical and business services organisation

Coordinates: 51.51255°N 0.078804°W

Lloyd's Register Group Limited

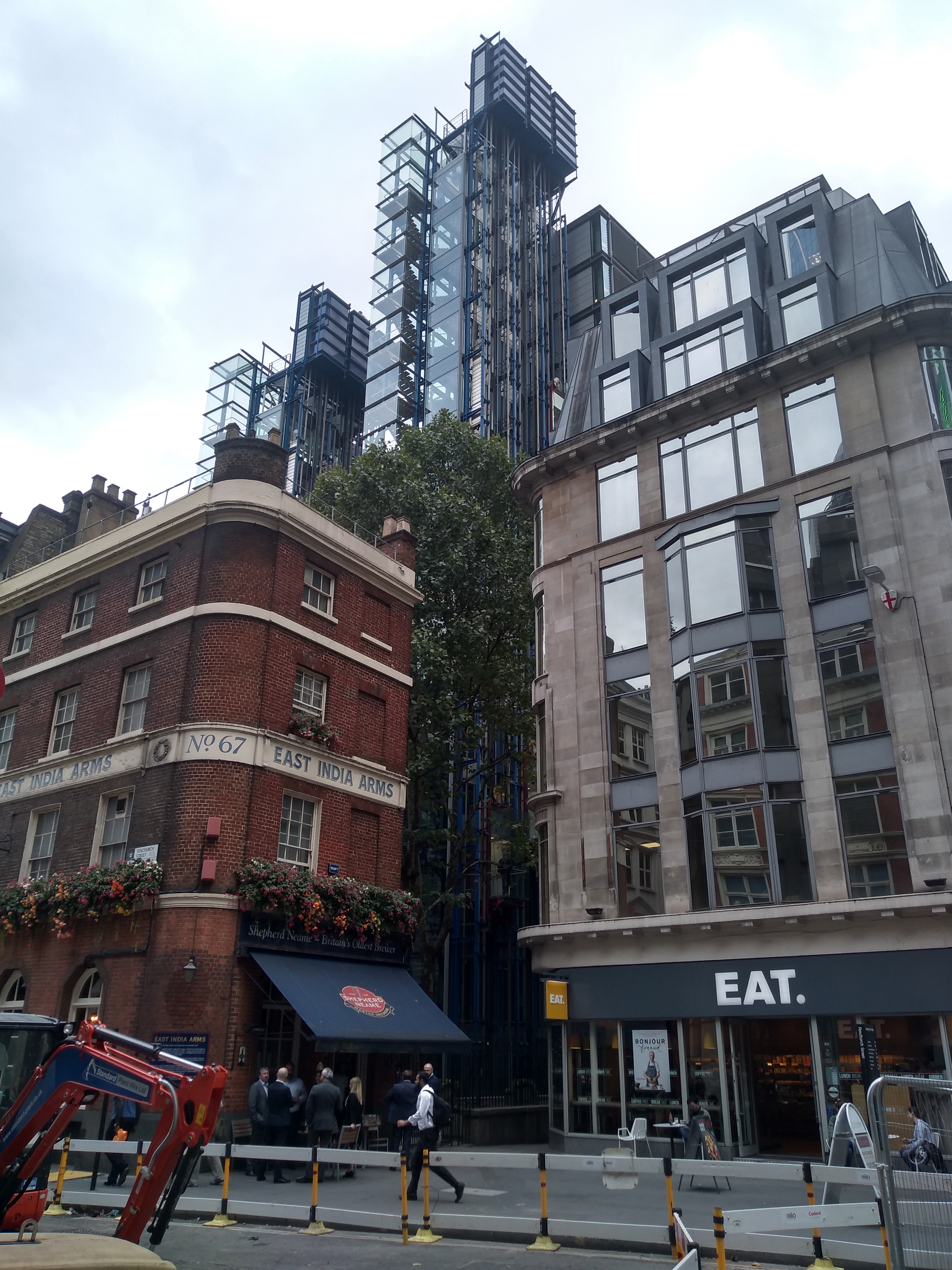
- Headquarters of Lloyd's Register
- Type: Private company limited by shares
- Industry: Maritime and shipping
- Genre: Classification society
- Founded: 1760 (266 years ago)
- Headquarters: 71 Fenchurch Street, London, United Kingdom
- Area served: Global
- Key people: Thomas Thune Andersen (Chairman); Nick Brown (CEO)
- Services: Classification
- Net income: £18 million
- Owner: Independent
- Number of employees: 3,600
- Parent: Lloyd's Register Foundation, UK registered charity
- Subsidiaries: i4 Insight; Hanseaticsoft
- Website: lr.org

Lloyd's Register Group Limited, trading as Lloyd's Register (LR), is a technical and professional services organisation and a maritime classification society, wholly owned by the Lloyd's Register Foundation, a UK charity dedicated to research and education in science and engineering. The organisation dates to 1760. Its stated aims are to enhance the safety of life, property, and the environment, by helping its clients (including by validation, certification, and accreditation) to improve the safety and performance of complex projects, supply chains and critical infrastructure.

Lloyd's Register is not affiliated with Lloyd's of London, but emerged from the same professional and social circles that historically met at Lloyd's Coffee House, from which both organisations took their name. In popular discourse the two organisations are often confused.

== History ==
=== Origin ===
The organisation was named after a seventeenth-century coffee house in London that was frequented by merchants, marine underwriters, and others associated with shipping. The coffee house owner, Edward Lloyd, helped them to exchange information by circulating a printed sheet of all the news he heard. In 1760, the Register Society was formed by the customers of the coffee house who assembled the Register of Shipping, the first known register of its type.

An example of Lloyd's Register of Shipping, dated 1768

Between 1800 and 1833, a dispute between shipowners and underwriters resulted in each group publishing a list—the "Red Book" and the "Green Book". Both parties came to the verge of bankruptcy. They reached agreement in 1834 to unite and form Lloyd's Register of British and Foreign Shipping, establishing a General Committee and charitable values. In 1914, with an increasingly international outlook, the organisation changed its name to Lloyd's Register of Shipping.

=== The Register ===
The Society printed the first Register of Ships in 1764 in order to give both underwriters and merchants an idea of the condition of the vessels they insured and chartered: ship hulls were graded by a lettered scale (A being the best), and ship's fittings (masts, rigging, and other equipment) were graded by number (1 being the best). Thus the best classification "A1", from which the expression A1 or A1 at Lloyd's is derived, first appeared in the 1775–76 edition of the Register.

The Register, with information on all seagoing, self-propelled merchant ships of 100 gross tons or greater, is published annually. A vessel remains registered with Lloyd's Register until it is sunk, wrecked, hulked, scrapped or withdrawn from the Register by the vessel's owner.

The Register was published formerly by the joint venture company of Lloyd's Register-Fairplay, which was formed in July 2001 by the merger of Lloyd's Register's Maritime Information Publishing Group and Prime Publications Limited. Lloyd's Register sold its share of the venture to IHS Markit in 2009.

=== American Lloyd's Register of American and Foreign Shipping ===
The American Lloyd's Registry of American and Foreign Shipping was established in 1857, and the American Lloyd's Register of American and Foreign Shipping issued from at least 1859 until at least 1883 by the "Board of American Lloyd's".

=== Modern era ===
In 2020, Lloyd's Register sold its energy business, which was rebranded Vysus Group and in 2021 sold its Business Assurance & Inspection Services division. In 2022, LR acquired OneOcean Group, a marine software and digital services company, to head up a new digital services division.

== Corporate structure ==
In July 2012, the organisation converted from an Industrial and Provident Society to a Company Limited by Shares, named Lloyd's Register Group Limited, with the new Lloyd's Register Foundation as the sole shareholder. At the same time the organisation gave to the Foundation a substantial bond and equity portfolio to assist it with its charitable purposes. It benefits from continued funding from the group's operating arm.

Lloyd's Register has changed and expanded over the last 250 years with the industrial revolutions - from a time when steam engines were developed for mechanical production to the digital and cyber technology of today. The latter developments are reflected in the acquisition of Nettitude, a cyber security specialist in 2018. Lloyd's Register has built a portfolio of digital, data and software solutions including greenfencetm, RTAMO and Seasafe.

== Property ==
Lloyd's Register's main office is located in London at 71 Fenchurch Street. It is one the many historic entities whose origin can be traced back to Lloyds Coffee House. It was towards the end of the nineteenth century before LR bought the Fenchurch Street site for £66,518. Thomas Collcutt, one of the finest London architects of the time, was commissioned to design a new headquarters, with the emphasis on architectural splendour. LR took possession of the new building in December 1901.

In the 1990s, Lloyd's Register knew it needed more office space in London and decided to build a new building in the courtyard behind the current building. Richard Rogers was seen to now be as equally prestigious as Collcutt was, and was chosen to create a design for a new modern building on the site. The result is what is now known as the Rogers Building, with the original building renamed as the Collcutt Building. Rogers created a two-tower glass, steel and concrete structure, opened by Queen Elizabeth II in November 2000, and which shouldn't be confused with the nearby Lloyd's building, the modern HQ of Lloyd's of London, also designed by Rogers.

Lloyd's Register also operates in more than 70 locations, serving clients based in 182 countries.

71 Fenchurch Street

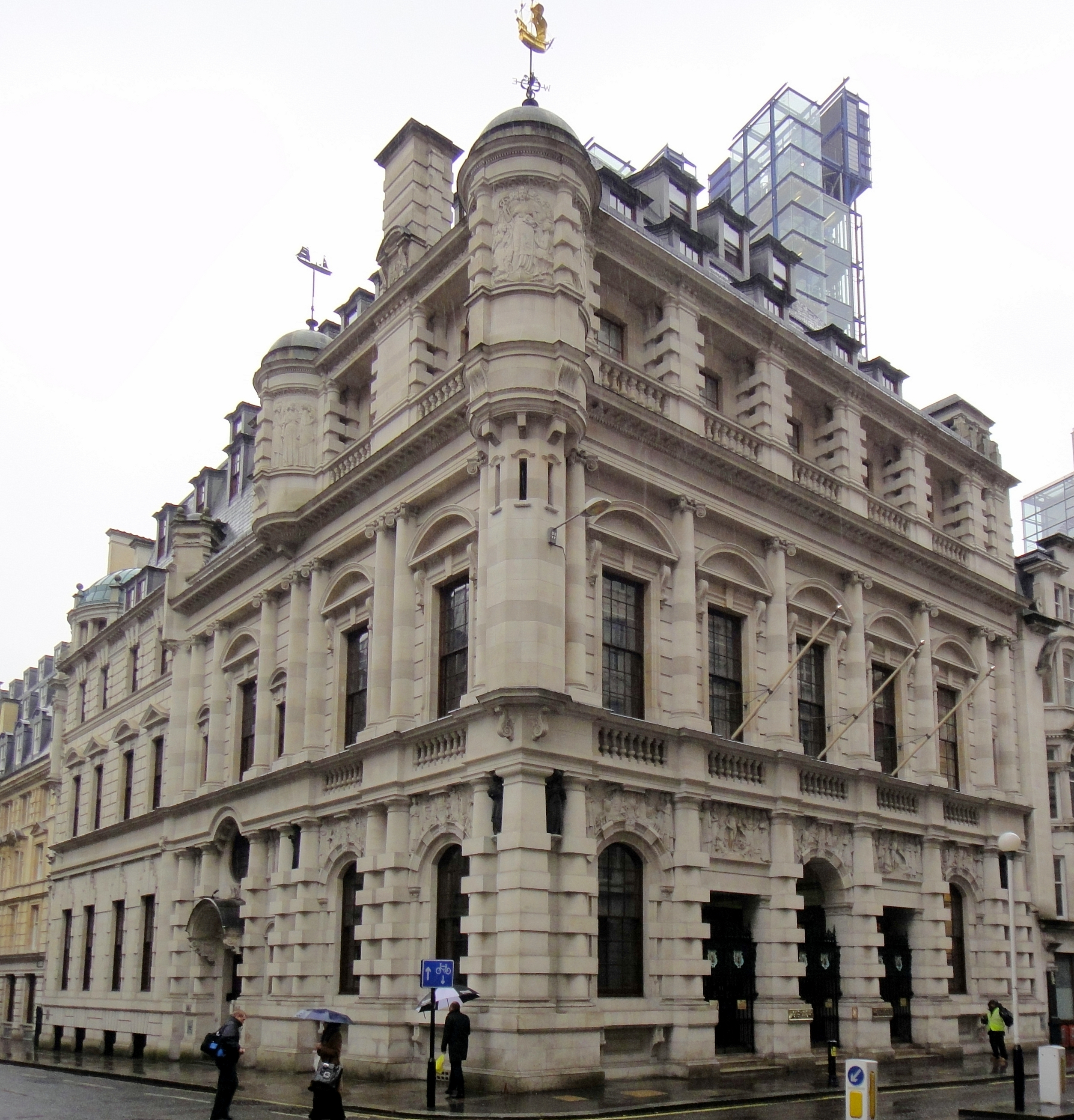
The Collcutt Building

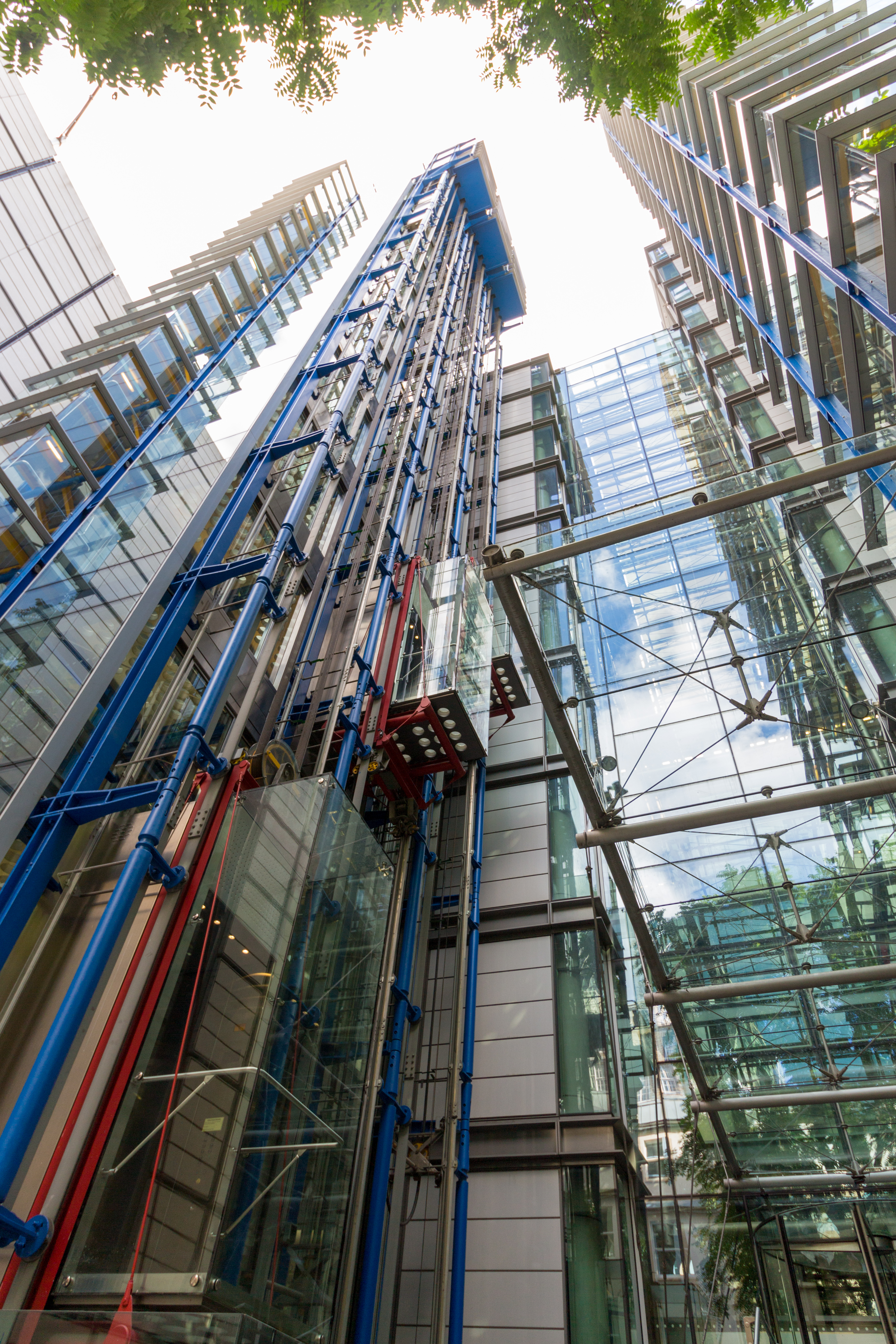
Central atrium of the Rogers Building

== Services ==
=== Nuclear ships project ===
In January 2024, Lloyd's Register signed a MOU with KEPCO, Zodiac Maritime and KSOE to assess rule requirements for the safe operation and regulatory compliance of nuclear powered bulk carriers and container ships to be designed and built by the consortium.

=== Classification rules ===
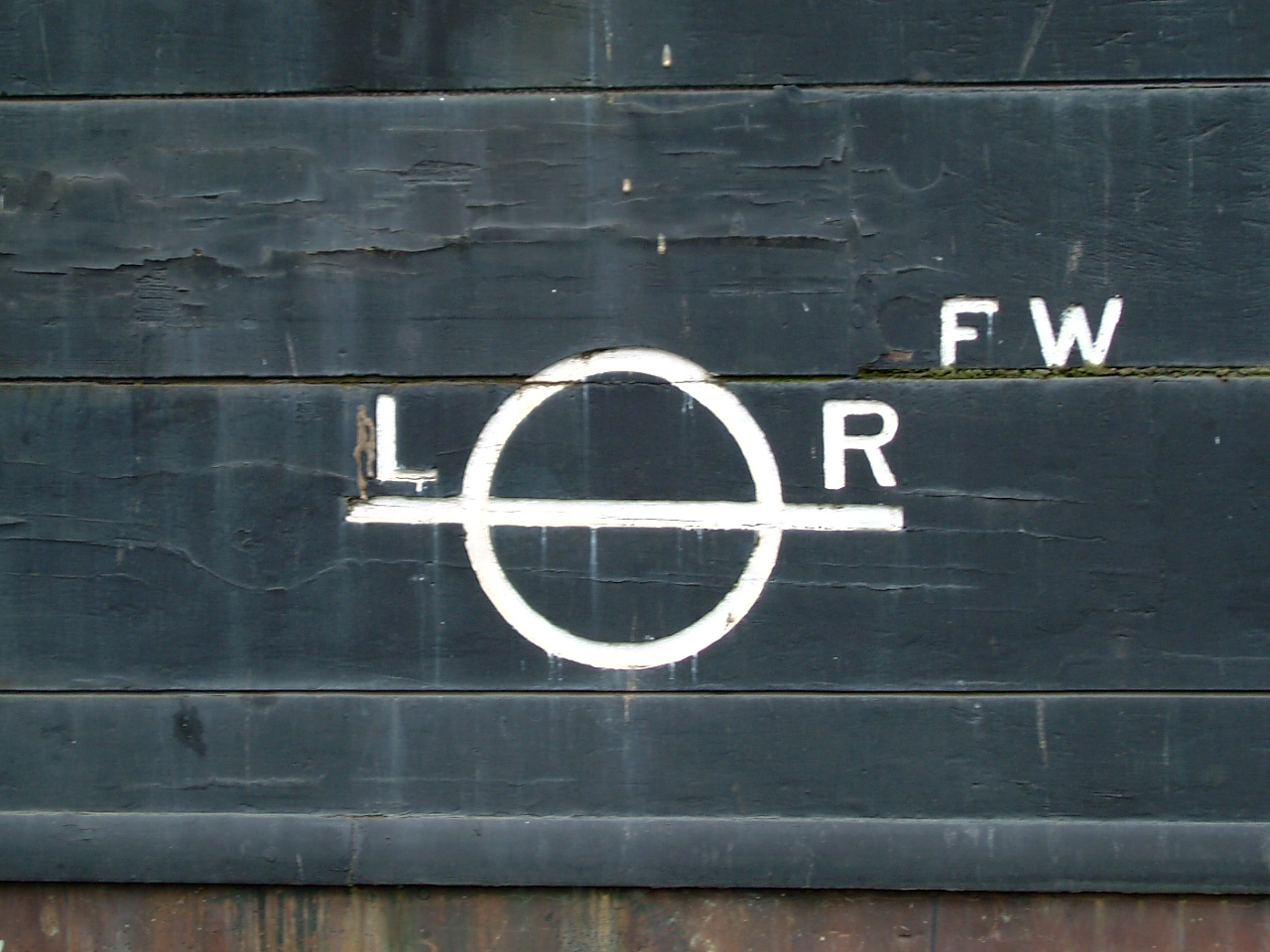
The Lloyd's Register load line on the hull of the Cutty Sark

Lloyd's Register is known best for the classification and certification of ships and inspects and approves important components and accessories, including life-saving appliances, marine pollution prevention, fire protection, navigation, radio communication equipment, deck gear, cables, ropes, and anchors.

LR's Rules for Ships

LR's Rules for Ships are derived from principles of naval architecture and marine engineering, and govern safety and operational standards for numerous merchant, military, and privately owned vessels. LR's Rules govern a number of topics including:

- Materials used for construction of the vessel
- Ship structural requirements and minimum scantlings, depending on ship type
- Operation and maintenance of main and auxiliary machinery
- Operation and maintenance of emergency and control systems

Specific editions of the rules are available to cater for merchant ships, naval ships, trimarans, special purpose vessels and offshore structures. A ship is known as being in class if she meets all the minimum requirements of LR's Rules, and such a status affects the possibility of a ship getting insurance. Class can be withdrawn from a ship if she is in violation of any regulations and does not maintain the minimum requirements specified by the company. However, exceptional circumstances may warrant special dispensation from Lloyd's Register. Any alteration to the vessel, whether it is a structural alteration or machinery, must be approved by Lloyd's Register before it is implemented.

Ships are inspected on a regular basis by a team of Lloyd's Register surveyors, one of the most important inspections being a ship's load line survey – due once every five years. Such a survey includes an inspection of the hull to make sure that the load line has not been altered. Numerous other inspections such as the condition of hatch and door seals, safety barriers, and guard rails are also performed. Upon completion the ship is allowed to be operated for another year, and is issued a load line certificate.

=== Rules and regulations ===
Lloyd's Register provide a list of rules and regulations to the public.

List of regulations

- The Rules and Regulations for the Classification of Ships
- The Rules and Regulations for the Classification of Special Service Craft
- The Rules and Regulations for the Classification of Naval Ships (a.k.a. the Naval Ship Rules)
- The Rules for the Manufacture, Testing and Certification of Materials
- Rules for Offshore Units
- The Rules for the Classification of Trimarans
- The Rules and Regulations for the Construction and Classification of Floating Docks
- The Rules and Regulations for the Classification of Natural Gas Fuelled Ships
- Rules and Regulations for the Classification of Linkspans
- Rules and Regulations for the Classification of Inland Waterways Ships
- Rules and Regulations for the Classification of Ships for Service on the Great Lakes and River St. Lawrence
- Rules and Regulations for the Construction and Classification of Ships for the Carriage of Liquefied Gases in Bulk
- Rules and Regulations for the Construction and Classification of Ships for the Carriage of Liquid Chemicals in Bulk
- Rules and Regulations for the Classification of Ships using Gases or other Low-flashpoint Fuels
- Rules and Regulations for the Construction and Classification of Submersibles and Underwater Diving Systems
- Code for Lifting Appliances in a Marine Environment
- Code for Offshore Personnel Transfer Systems
- Rules for the Classification of Trimarans
- Rules for Air Cushion Vehicles
- Rules for Ergonomic Container Lashing
- Rules for LNG Ships and Barges Equipped with Regasification Systems
- Rules for the Classification of Potable Water Carriers
- Rules for Sail-Assisted Ships
- Rules for the Application of Sandwich Panel Construction to Ship Structure
- Rules for the Classification of Stern First Ice Class Ships
- Rules for the Winterisation of Ships
- Common Structural Rules for Bulk Carriers and Oil Tankers
- Grey Boat Code
- Submarine Assurance Framework
