= IMO number =

International ship identification number

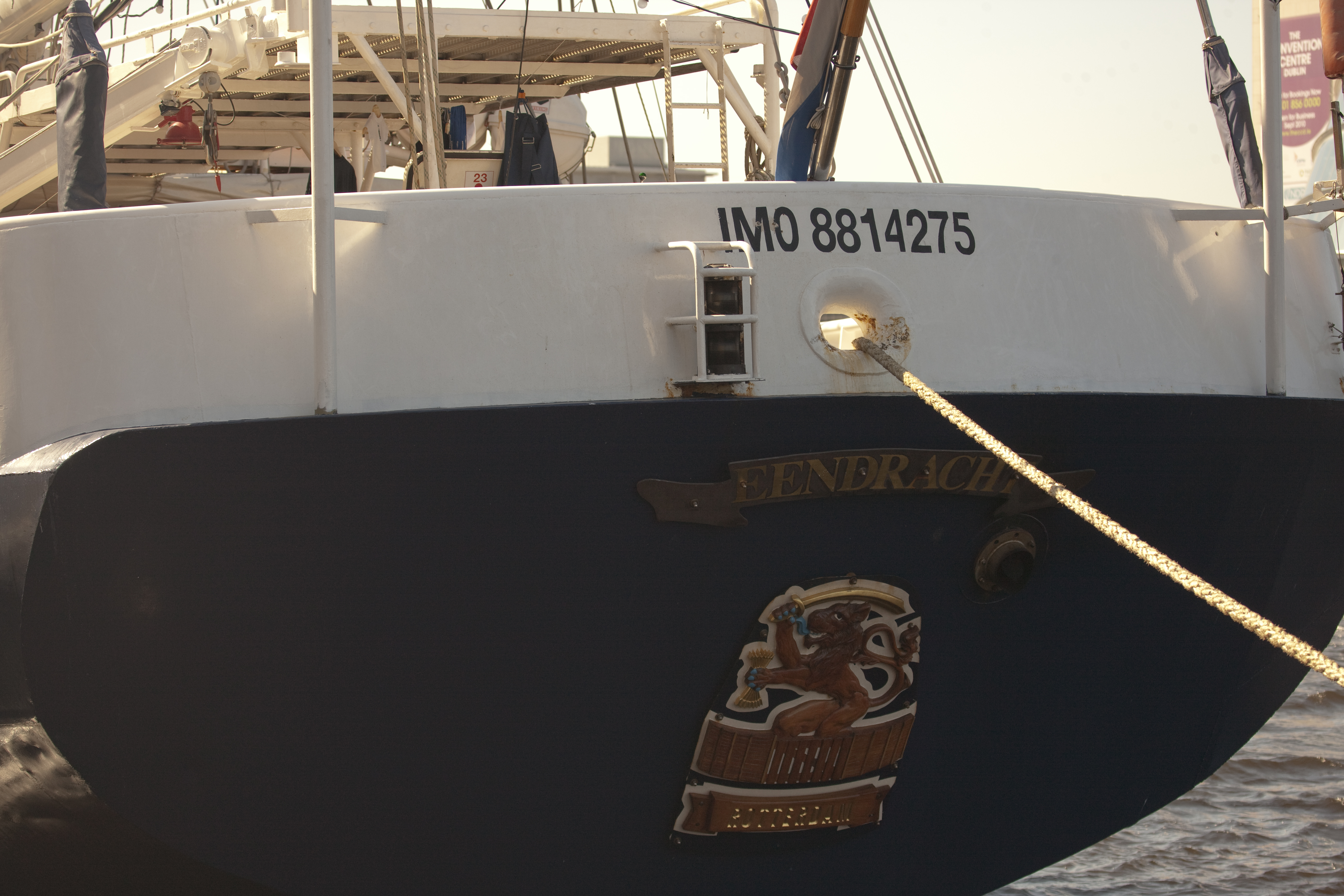
"IMO 8814275" on Eendracht

The IMO number of the International Maritime Organization is a generic term with two distinct applications:

- the IMO ship identification number is a unique ship identifier; or,
- the IMO company and registered owner identification number is used to identify uniquely each company and/or registered owner managing ships of at least 100 gross tons (gt).

The schemes are managed in parallel, but IMO company/owner numbers may also be obtained by managers of vessels not having IMO ship numbers. IMO numbers were introduced to improve maritime safety and reduce fraud and pollution, under the International Convention for the Safety of Life at Sea (SOLAS).

The IMO ship number scheme has been mandatory, for SOLAS signatories, for passenger and cargo ships above a certain size since 1996, and voluntarily applicable to various other vessels since 2013/2017. The number identifies a ship and does not change when the ship's owner, country of registry (flag state) or name changes, unlike the official numbers used in some countries, e.g. the UK. The ship's certificates must also bear the IMO ship number. Since 1 July 2004, passenger ships are also required to carry the marking on a horizontal surface visible from the air.

== History ==
=== IMO resolutions (1987–2017) ===
In 1987 the IMO adopted Resolution A.600(15) to create the IMO ship identification number scheme aimed at the "enhancement of maritime safety and pollution prevention and the prevention of maritime fraud" by assigning to each ship a unique permanent identification number. Lloyd's Register had already introduced permanent numbers for all the ships in their published register in 1963, and these were modified to seven-digit numbers in 1969. It is this number series that was adopted as the basis for IMO ship numbers in 1987.

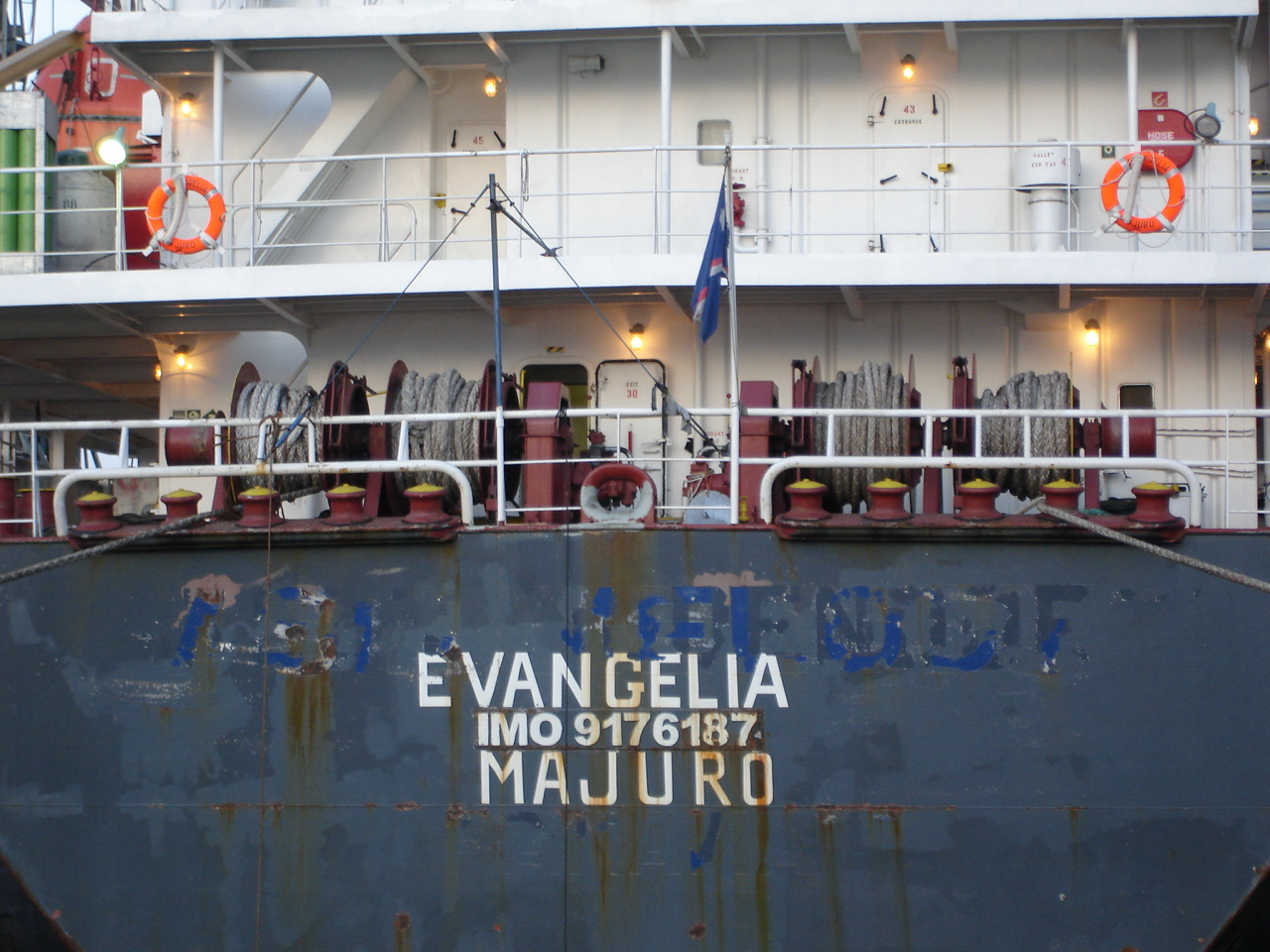
Stern of Evangelia displaying "IMO 9176187"

Unique and permanent numbers are needed due to the frequent changes in ships' names or other details. As one example, the vessel with IMO ship number "IMO 9176187" was built in Japan, has been through the names Asia Melody, Cornelie Oldendorff, Maxima, Jaydee M, Evangelia, Evangeli, Shinsung Dream and Orange Dream, has operated under the flags of Panama, Liberia, Marshall Islands, the Republic of Korea and Sierra Leone, with numerous different owners/operators, and has had home port of Majuro, Freetown and Cheju, but its IMO number has remained unchanged throughout.

The original resolution applied to cargo vessels (meaning "ships which are not passenger ships") of at least 300 gt and passenger vessels of at least 100 gt.

This resolution was revoked in 2013, being replaced by Resolution A.1078(28), which allowed application of the Scheme to ships of 100 gt and above, including fishing vessels. That in turn was revoked in 2017 and replaced by Resolution A.1117(30), which allows its application to ships of 100 gt and above, "including fishing vessels of steel and non-steel hull construction; passenger ships of less than 100 gt, high-speed passenger craft and mobile offshore drilling units [...]; and all motorized inboard fishing vessels of less than 100 gt down to a size limit of 12 metres in length overall (LOA), authorized to operate outside waters under the national jurisdiction of the flag State". IMO resolutions are "for implementation on a voluntary basis".

Although not mandatory under SOLAS, since IMO ship numbers became available also to fishing vessels in 2013, some regional fisheries management organisations, the European Union and other organizations or states have made them mandatory for fishing vessels above a certain size.

=== SOLAS regulation (1994) ===
SOLAS regulation XI-1/3 was adopted in 1994 and came into force on 1 January 1996, making IMO ship numbers mandatory for those countries that have ratified (or acceded to, accepted, approved, adopted, etc.) SOLAS.

The IMO scheme and hence SOLAS regulation does not apply to:

- ships without mechanical means of propulsion
- pleasure yachts
- ships engaged on special service (e.g. lightships, SAR vessels)
- hopper barges
- hydrofoils, air cushion vehicles
- floating docks and structures classified in a similar manner
- ships of war and troopships
- wooden ships.

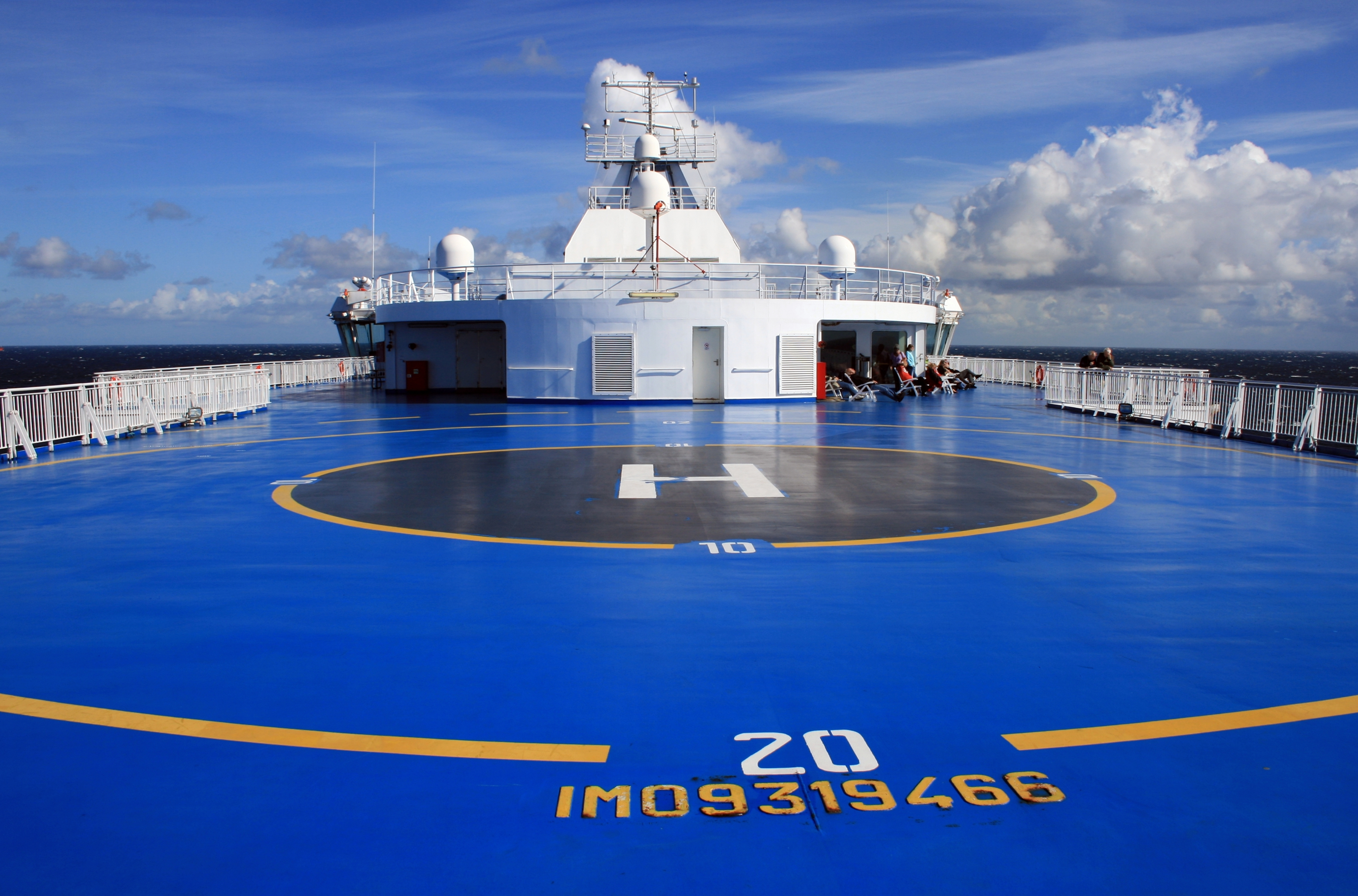
"IMO 9319466" on the helideck of M/S Finnmaid

=== Security enhancements 2002 ===
In December 2002, the Diplomatic Conference on Maritime Security adopted a number of measures aimed at enhancing security of ships and port facilities. This included a modification to SOLAS Regulation XI-1/3 to require the IMO ship numbers to be permanently marked in a visible place either on the ship's hull or superstructure as well as internally and on the ship's certificates. Passenger ships should also carry the marking on a horizontal surface visible from the air. The enhanced regulations came into effect on 1 July 2004.

=== Company and Registered Owner Regulation 2005 ===
In May 2005, IMO adopted a new SOLAS regulation XI-1/3-1 on the mandatory company and registered owner identification number scheme, with entry into force on 1 January 2009.

The regulation provides that every ship owner and management company shall have a unique identification number. Other amendments require these numbers to be added to the relevant certificates and documents in the International Safety Management Code (ISM) and the International Ship and Port Facility Security Code (ISPS). Like the IMO ship identification number, the company identification number is a seven-digit number with the prefix IMO. For example, for the ship Atlantic Star (IMO 8024026), IMO 5304986 referred to the former ship manager Pullmantur Cruises Ship Management Ltd and IMO 5364264 to her former owner, Pullmantur Cruises Empress Ltd.

== Assignment ==
S&P Global is the manager of the scheme and, as such, identifies and assigns IMO numbers without charge. The organization was previously known as Lloyd's Register-Fairplay, IHS Fairplay and IHS Maritime.

For new vessels, the IMO ship number is assigned to a hull during construction, generally upon keel laying. Many vessels which fall outside the mandatory requirements of SOLAS have numbers allocated by Lloyd's Register or IHS Markit in the same numerical series, including fishing vessels and commercial yachts.

In the event a ship's hull is split apart, the IMO number continues with the portion surrounding the engines.

Lloyd's Register first assigned these numbers in the supplements to the 1963 edition; they prefixed a "5" to the sequential number in that volume (thus 500001 through 539966). For ships added or renamed during the year, thus appearing in the supplements, a prefix of "54" was used. In following volumes new numbers were issued with a prefix of the first two digits of the year, so 64xxxx and up. The seventh check digit was added in 1969. In 1971, LR numbers started to be assigned at the shipbuilding contract instead of ship completion, changing the meaning of the first two digits. In 1991, the year prefixes were discontinued and a straight numerical sequence was used. In March 2023, the highest IMO number (9999993) was given to a ship scheduled for construction in 2027. Thereafter, previously unused "low" sequence numbers were issued, with a "1" prefix, and staying with seven digits.

== Structure ==
=== IMO number of a vessel ===
An IMO number is made of the three letters "IMO" followed by a seven-digit number. This consists of a six-digit sequential unique number followed by a check digit. The integrity of an IMO number can be verified using its check digit. The checksum of an IMO ship identification number is calculated by multiplying each of the first six digits by a factor of 7 to 2 corresponding to their position from right to left. The rightmost digit of this sum is the check digit.

Example for IMO 9074729:

(9×7) + (0×6) + (7×5) + (4×4) + (7×3) + (2×2) = 139.

=== IMO number of a company ===
The checksum of an IMO company and registered owner identification number is calculated somewhat differently. The first six digits are multiplied by the respective weights: 8, 6, 4, 2, 9, and 7 and then summed. From this sum modulo 11 is taken. The result of which is subtracted from 11. And modulo 10 of this difference results in the check digit.

Example for company IMO 2041999:

$$\begin{align}\mbox{check digit} &= (11 - (2 \times 8 + 0 \times 6 + 4 \times 4 + 1 \times 2 + 9 \times 9 + 9 \times 7) \bmod 11) \bmod 10 \\
&= (11 - (16 + 0 + 16 + 2 + 81 + 63) \bmod 11) \bmod 10 \\
&= (11 - 178 \bmod 11) \bmod 10 \\
&= (11 - 2) \bmod 10 \\
&= 9 \bmod 10 = 9
\end{align}$$

== See also ==
- ENI number, a comparable system for European barges and other inland waterway vessels
- Maritime Mobile Service Identity (MMSI), 9-digit numbers identifying mobile radio stations, used alongside IMO numbers
