= Markit =

British financial services company, 2003–2016

Markit Ltd.
- Type: Public
- Traded as: Nasdaq: MRKT
- Industry: Financial services
- Founded: 2003; 23 years ago
- Defunct: 12 July 2016
- Fate: Merged with IHS Inc. to form IHS Markit
- Successor: IHS Markit
- Headquarters: London, England
- Number of locations: 21 offices
- Area served: Worldwide
- Key people: Jerre Stead (CEO IHS Markit) & Lance Uggla (president IHS Markit)
- Products: Financial information Financial processing Financial services Financial solutions Market data vendor
- Revenue: ▲US$ $1.5 billion
- Number of employees: 4,500 (October 2015)
- Divisions: Information; Processing; Solutions
- Website: www.markit.com

Markit was a British financial information and services company that focused on credit derivative pricing founded in 2003.

Prior to its merger, it had 4,500 employees in 21 offices worldwide and was as an independent source of credit derivative pricing. The company provided independent financial data, trade processing of derivatives, foreign exchange and loans, customised technology platforms and managed services. The company aimed to enhance corporate transparency, reduce financial risk and improve operational economic efficiency. Its client base included institutional participants in the financial marketplace.

On 12 July 2016, Markit and IHS Inc. merged in an all-stock merger of equals to form IHS Markit. IHS Markit later merged with S&P Global on 28 February 2022.

== History ==
=== Foundation and early years ===
Markit was founded in 2003 by Canadian Lance Uggla in St Albans, outside London, as Mark-it Partners to provide daily credit default swap (CDS) pricing.

Markit's credit derivative data sales rose during the subprime mortgage crisis in 2007 and later years.

In September 2009, Markit and Depository Trust & Clearing Corporation (DTCC) launched MarkitSERV, a joint venture to provide over-the-counter (OTC) derivative trade processing.

=== Acquisitions 2004 - 2009 ===
Totem Valuations, a supplier of consensus valuations and month-end data, was bought by Markit in May 2004.

The International Index Company (IIC) and CDS Index Company (CDSIndexCo), owners of the iTraxx and CDX credit default swap indexes, were acquired by Markit in November 2007.

In December 2007, Markit announced the acquisition of SwapsWire.

The BOAT, Markets in Financial Instruments Directive-compliant trade reporting platform acquired by Markit from a consortium of nine investment banks In January 2008. The BOAT was owned by consortium of nine investment banks —ABN Amro, Citigroup, Credit Suisse, Deutsche Bank, Goldman Sachs, HSBC, Merrill Lynch, Morgan Stanley and UBS who had launched the system in September 2006. The Boat platform was established by these nine banks "for the collection and sale of trading data following the introduction of EU's Markets in Financial Instruments Directive (MiFID) in November 2007.

JPMorgan Chase's FCS Corporation, a provider of syndicated loan market portfolio and risk management software and services, including the Wall Street Office family of products, was acquired by Markit in July 2008.

Fidelity Information Services's ClearPar, an electronic loan-trade-processing platform, was acquired by Markit in October 2009 which helped Markit to work with DTCC to improve the processing of syndicated loans.

=== Public listing and growth ===
In 2013, Temasek Holdings bought 10% of shares for $500 million, thereby valuing the company at $5 bn.

By 2012, the company had annual revenues of US$860 million, with over 3,000 employees and had a $5 billion valuation. In 2013, different banks held 51% of Markit shares. 20% of shares were held by Markit employees and executives.

On 5 May 2014, Markit Ltd., a company registered in Bermuda, filed for an initial public offering (IPO), to be listed on the NASDAQ Global Select Market under the symbol MRKT. The stock began trading on 19 June 2014 with an initial pricing of $24 per share.

=== Merger ===
On 12 July 2016, Markit and IHS Inc. merged in an all-stock merger of equals to form IHS Markit.

== Index products ==
On 17 January 2006, CDS IndexCo and Markit launched ABX.HE, a subprime mortgage backed credit derivative index, with plans to extend the index to underlying asset types other than home equity loans.

On 19 January 2006, it launched the Home Equity (ABX.HE) ABX. The following year in 2007, the loan credit default swap index (LCDX), a loan-only credit default swap index, was created by CDS Index Company (CDSIndexCo).

Sixteen financial institutions including: JPMorgan, Goldman Sachs, Deutsche Bank, Barclays Capital, Bank of America, BNP Paribas, Citigroup, Credit Suisse, Lehman Brothers, Merrill Lynch, RBS Greenwich, UBS and Wachovia, owned the private company called the CDS Index Company (CDS IndexCo), that developed the ABX index. By 2007 Markit marketed had acquired (CDS IndexCo). The ABX index was a credit default swap of asset-backed mortgages of 30 of the most liquid mortgage-backed bonds.

In 2013, Atlanta-based IntercontinentalExchange, a derivatives exchange and clearing house operator, announced four credit index futures contracts, based on the Markit CDX and Markit iTraxx indices—Markit CDX NA IG, Markit CDX NA HY, Markit iTraxx Europe (Main), and Markit iTraxx Crossover, would start in May 2013.

== Divisions, products and services ==
Markit organized itself in three divisions:

Division	Information	Processing	Solutions
Products and services	Valuation and Trading Services; Portfolio Valuations; Totem; Pricing and Reference Data; major asset classes; Reference Entity Database (“RED”); Bond Reference Data; Indices; PMI series, iBoxx, iTraxx, CDX and iRxx.EM	MarkitSERV: derivatives; MarkitClear: loans	Enterprise Software; Enterprise Data Management (EDM); Analytics; Wall Street Office (WSO); Managed Services; Markit On Demand (MOD); Counterparty Manager
revenue % (2013)	48.5%	28.0%	23.5%
