= Fairplay (magazine) =

British weekly shipping publication

- Categories: Trade magazine
- Frequency: Weekly
- Founder: Thomas Hope Robinson
- Founded: 1883
- Final issue: December 6, 2018
- Company: IHS Markit
- Country: United Kingdom
- Based in: Coulsdon
- Language: English
- Website: fairplay.ihs.com
- ISSN: 2514-4057

Fairplay was a weekly news magazine devoted to the international merchant shipping industry, delivering “content tailored for its core audience of ship owners, managers, operators and charterers.“ It was founded by Thomas Hope Robinson in 1883 and remained in continual publication until 2018. From 2011, Fairplay's publishing company IHS Fairplay was a division of IHS Markit.

== History ==
=== Startup and development ===
After Thomas Hope Robinson had lost his money at the stock exchange in 1883, he tried a new career as publisher by starting Fairplay weekly with borrowed money. His intention was to “speak out, loud and bold … for the shipowner, as an advocate, not a judge”. In the first issue he wrote: "There is so little Fairplay in the world. If our own efforts succeed, we shall have taken the first steps towards promoting the habit of calling things by their right name and looking at them through uncoloured spectacles." Apart from a brief period in the 1990s, this maxim appeared in every issue. The enterprise was successful and soon increased in size and revenue. The publisher's son Gordon Hope Robinson (died 1953) took over in 1912 and Fairplay remained a family business until 1973. It was then taken over by the Financial Times before a management buyout, led by John Prime, created Prime Publications in 1978.

=== Data management ===
The company began publishing directories in the 1960s and data management became a sector of growing importance, resulting in the 1964 cooperation with International Shipping Information Services, which became FIRS, Fairplay International Research and Statistics. In 1973, the Fairplay company was taken over by the Financial Times group, before a management buy-out in 1978, one of the first in the UK, transferred ownership to Prime Publications. Prime improved the data management sector by storing information in databases and started to sell directories on CD-ROM in the 1990s.

=== Internet age ===
Fairplay was the first maritime publication to start an internet and email daily news service, in 1996. Its data management activities led to a joint venture with Lloyd's Register in 2001, known as Lloyd's Register–Fairplay (LR Fairplay). This new enterprise was then the sole provider of IMO numbers. The next years saw several acquisitions of other companies and, in 2004, a partnership with HITT of the Netherlands, which created AISLive, a broadcast system for tracking vessel movements. Fairplay was acquired by IHS in 2008, including 50% of LR Fairplay, and the corporation also bought Lloyd's Register's 50% share of that maritime data business in 2009.

== Final years ==
In 2011, the Fairplay publication company was renamed IHS Fairplay. It produced the weekly magazine in print, a digital edition, a daily email newsletter, and the monthly magazine Solutions. Fairplay's website also provided up-to-date news and information for registered users and subscribers. The organisation was then based in Coulsdon, UK, with offices in America, Singapore, Sweden and a network of correspondents worldwide.

In September 2018 it was announced that Fairplay would cease publication by the end of 2018, with the last issue in the first week of December.

== Editors ==
- Thomas Hope Robinson (1883-1912)
- Gordon Hope Robinson (1912-1953)
- WH Wendon (1953-1959)
- John Hearth (1959-1966)
- Dunlop Ewart (1966-1981)
- Michael Grey (1981-1988)
- Chris Hewer (1988-1995)
- Stewart Wade (1995)
- Bruce MacMichael (1995-1996)
- Paul Gunton (1996-2003)
- Patrick Neylan (2003-2008)
- Richard Clayton
- Nicola Good
