= ITraxx =

Credit derivative brand

iTraxx (Thomson Reuters Eikon code 'ITRAXX'; Bloomberg code 'ITRX') is the brand name for the family of credit default swap index products covering regions of Europe, Australia, Japan and non-Japan Asia. Credit derivative indexes form a large sector of the overall credit derivative market. The indices are constructed on a set of rules with the overriding criterion being that of liquidity of the underlying credit default swaps (CDS).

The group of indices was formed by the merger in 2004 of the Trac-X indices created by J.P. Morgan & Co. and Morgan Stanley and the iBoxx CDS indices created by Deutsche Bank, ABN Amro and IBoxx.

== History ==
Credit default swap indices originated in 2001, as did synthetic credit indices, when J.P. Morgan launched the JECI and Hydi indices.(Nolan & Sproehnle 2011) Then Morgan Stanley's Credit desk (under Annabel Littlewood) launched Synthetic TRACERS.(Nolan & Sproehnle 2011) "The two banks subsequently merged their indices under the Trac-X name in 2003.(Packer & Suthiphongchai 2003, p. 82)

In parallel, ABN AMRO and Deutsche Bank teamed with iBoxx to launch the iBoxx CDS indices in February 2003. These indices were the first to have an independent calculation agent in an index provider (and not an investment bank trading the underlying). In 2004, Trac-X and iBoxx merged to form CDX in North America and iTraxx in Europe and Asia."(Nolan & Sproehnle 2011) The iTraxx suite of indices are owned, managed, compiled and published by Markit, who also license market makers. Markit administered the CDX family of indices and acting as the calculation agent for the iTraxx indices. In November 2007 Markit acquired CDX and iTraxx. By 2011 Markit owned and managed "the Markit iTraxx, Markit CDX, Markit iTraxx SovX, Markit iTraxx LevX, and Markit LCDX families of CDS indices as well as the Markit iBoxx cash bond indices."(Nolan & Sproehnle 2011)

By 2011 Markit iTraxx and Markit CDX index trade volumes exceeded US$70 billion a day. They had a "net notional outstanding over US$1.2 trillion." In 2011 Markit iTraxx and Markit CDX index traded almost 50% of the market in single name credit derivatives.(Nolan & Sproehnle 2011)

On 25 February 2013 ICC launched iTraxx instruments for dealer-dealer and client clearing.

== Market ==
Credit default swap indices allow an investor to transfer credit risk in a more efficient manner than using groups of single credit default swaps. They are standardised contracts and reference a fixed number of obligors with shared characteristics. Investors can be long or short the index which is equivalent to being protection buyers or sellers.

In 1996 the outstanding notional value of credit derivatives (credit default swaps (CDSs)) was $40 billion. By the end of 2001 it was approximately $1.2 trillion. By 2004 it was expected to be $4.8 trillion. Credit default swaps (CDSs) accounted for roughly 45% of the overall credit derivatives market in 2002.(Packer & Suthiphongchai 2003, p. 79)

In 1997 there were three kinds of CDSs: corporate, bank and sovereign. CreditTrade was one of the major trading platforms for credit derivatives in 2003. (Packer & Suthiphongchai 2003, p. 79)

Creditex was the first inter-dealer broker to offer electronic CDS trading in 2004.

Sovereign CDSs, which benefited from the standardisation of contract form and definitions in 1998 and 1999 as well as successful execution in the case of recent defaults, were considered the most liquid credit derivative instruments in emerging markets. Particularly as their liquidity increases, sovereign CDSs had the potential to supplement and increase efficiency in underlying sovereign bond markets.

Between 2004 and the first half of 2007, the creation of credit derivatives indexes, credit default swap indexes, which essentially involve investors selling credit protection on a group of companies, was one of the factors that helped to drive spreads tighter.(Barley 2008) Since 5 February 2008 the index spread widened by 25 basis points to a record high just above 110 basis, 60 basis points wider than 1 January 2008 and 90 basis points higher than they were prior to the credit crisis, when basis points were at all-time lows. At 110 basis points it would cost "110,000 euros a year to insure 10 million euros of debt against default." By mid-February 2008, as complex credit instruments unravelled, credit derivatives indexes in Europe set repeated new record highs. The Markit iTraxx Europe index ITRAC5EA=GFI had displaced the iTraxx Crossover index ITCRS5EA=GFI, which was made up of 50 mostly "junk"-rated companies. The Europe index sharply underperformed the iTraxx Crossover index ITCRS5EA=GFI.(Barley 2008)

== Trading ==
The most widely traded of the indices is the iTraxx Europe index, also known simply as 'The Main', composed of the most liquid 125 CDS referencing European investment grade credits, subject to certain sector rules as determined by the IIC and also as determined by the SEC. There is also significant volume, in nominal values, of trading in the HiVol and Crossover (also referred to as Xover) indices. HiVol is a subset of the main Europe index consisting of what are seen as the most risky 30 constituents at the time the index is constructed. Crossover is constructed in a similar way but is composed of a min of 40 and a max of 50 sub-investment grade credits. Also traded are iTraxx Sector indices: NonFin (non-financials), SenFin (senior-financials) and SubFin (sub-financials).

The constituents of the indices are changed every six months, a process known as "rolling" the index. The roll dates are March 20 and September 20 each year. For example, Series 13 was launched on March 20, 2010, with a maturity of June 20, 2015 for the 5-year contract. Other maturities for Europe and Crossover are 3 year, 7 year and the 10 year, whilst the NonFin, SenFin and SubFin only trade at maturities of 5 and 10 years.

Trading in iTraxx CDS contracts predominantly occurs in the over-the-counter (OTC) market. However, as of February 25, 2013, the IntercontinentalExchange (ICE) began offering central clearing of iTraxx products. Furthermore, as part of the Dodd-Frank financial overhaul, the Commodity Futures Trading Commission has mandated central clearing of most iTraxx products for entities subject to its jurisdiction beginning April 25, 2013, though the relevant compliance date depends on the size of the entity trading iTraxx products.
