= Seducing Ingrid Bergman =

2012 novel by Chris Greenhalgh

- Author: Chris Greenhalgh
- Language: English
- Genre: Fiction
- Publisher: Penguin Books Ltd.
- Publication date: 4 October 2012
- Publication place: United Kingdom
- Media type: Print (paperback)
- Pages: 272pp (first edition, PB)
- ISBN: 978-0670922116 (first edition, PB)

Seducing Ingrid Bergman is a 2012 novel by Chris Greenhalgh. It dramatises the real-life affair between the actress Ingrid Bergman and the war photographer Robert Capa.

== Plot summary ==
The novel opens in 1945, where France has been recently liberated by Allied Forces. Robert Capa has photographed the Normandy Landings and been parachuted into Germany, now he is kicking his heels in Paris, waiting for something to happen. As a dare, he slips a note under the door of Ingrid Bergman's room at the Ritz, inviting her for a drink, and the flirtation escalates quickly into a passionate affair. Ingrid has a husband, child and career back in Hollywood. Capa can't escape from his traumatic memories of the war or his addiction to the adrenaline high that he only gets from his work. Against his better judgement, Capa follows Ingrid to California, but both still have painful choices to make.

== Film adaptation ==
On 5 June 2013, it was announced that film rights to the novel had been acquired by YRF Entertainment, to be adapted for the screen by Arash Amel. The film is to be directed by James Mangold.

== Editions ==
=== English ===
- UK paperback : Viking, Penguin Books Ltd., 4 October 2012 (ISBN 978-0670922116)
