= Screen Digest =

British business intelligence company

Screen Digest Ltd was a London‑based provider of business intelligence, research, and analysis on global media markets. The company originated from a monthly journal of the same name founded in 1971. Screen Digest was acquired in 2010 by technology research firm iSuppli, which itself was later acquired by information services company IHS Inc. In 2019, successor company IHS Markit sold most of its Technology, Media and Telecoms division to Informa, receiving Informa's Agriculture Intelligence unit in return. In 2020, Informa merged the acquired research businesses to form Omdia.

== Company history ==
Screen Digest was founded in 1971 by journalist and documentary film-maker John Chittock, then film and video correspondent of the Financial Times, together with his business partner and wife Joy Chittock. Initially, it was a news digest containing abstracts of a range of media, including film and cinema, television and in particular the nascent video sector, with editorial emphasis on the relevance and brevity of stories.

From the first issue, it has been characterised by the use of icons to identify the broad media subject area of each news story and the inclusion of contact information for companies, as well as organisations mentioned in news items. Other features from the start were the inclusion in the subscription of a free binder and detailed annual index, based on the concept of acting as a journal of record.

In February 1972, a four-page centre section on yellow paper was introduced, initially to carry a page of reference material and articles from members of the industry. Among early contributors were Robert W Sarnoff, then chairman of RCA, film director and teacher Thorold Dickinson and the BBC director-general Charles Curran. This developed into a data-related eight-page section based on the company's recent research. Also in that month David Fisher joined as news editor and led in the shaping of the standards of the commercial publication. He became editor in July 1974 and held that position until January 2011.

In the mid 1970s, Chittock and Fisher produced a daily half-hour closed-circuit radio programme for delegates at the 1976 British Industrial Film Festival in Brighton, and repeated the exercise the following year's 18th International Industrial Film Festival at the National Film Theatre in London.

In 1976, Screen Digest formed an alliance with Nord Media, a London-based research business owned by Ebav, an audio-visual company jointly owned by the Scandinavian enterprises Esselte and Bonnier. The partnership ended in May 1980.

Chittock sold the company in July 1996 to a management team comprising David Fisher, Allan Hardy, Ben Keen and Mark Smith. At that time, the company had one full-time employee. Since then, Screen Digest has expanded its consultancy and report publishing activities, as well as developing a set of continuously updated online information and data services on Advertising, Broadband Media, Cinema, Games, Mobile Media, Television, Television technology and Video. Screen Digest now counts over 50 full-time employees, with bases in New York and California in the US and Melbourne, Australia, as well as London.

In 2007, Screen Digest acquired the US video market research company Adams Media Research, and established Screen Digest Inc. The Global Media Intelligence (GMI) division was formed in 2007 to supply reports on media companies for corporate investors. During this period, Hollywood screenwriter Arash Amel was formerly a leading media analyst at the company, overseeing the launch of the US services.

== David Fisher ==
David Fisher was educated at Bolton School and graduated from the London School of Film Technique. He published a book, The Craft of Film (Attic Publishing, 1970). He has been the editor of the media journal Screen Digest since 1974. He was executive editor of Television: The Journal of the Royal Television Society between 1978 and 1982.

Kraszna-Krausz Foundation awarded a grant to continue David Fisher's compilation of an international hypertext cross-referenced chronology of media development from 1820 to present day and arrange publication as Chronomedia by Terra Media.

== Media conferences ==
In its association with Nord Media, Screen Digest staged two video conferences: Video Disc 77 and Video Disc and Videogram 79.

In May 1981, Screen Digest was involved in conference organisation for the International Video Week, co-ordinated by The Economist and held on the South Bank, London. The event was staged again the following year. Several industry lunches were also held in London around this time, which included guest speakers such as Buckminster Fuller and Rosita Sarnoff, granddaughter of David Sarnoff.

In 1996, Screen Digest became responsible for arranging the conference programme for the annual European Video Perspective (PEVE) home entertainment conferences and in 2007 acquired the sole ownership of the event.
