= Umedia =

Belgian film production company

- Industry: Film production, VFX
- Founded: 2004; 22 years ago (as Motion Investment Group); 2010; 16 years ago (as Umedia)
- Founders: Nadia Khamlichi; Adrian Politowski; Jeremy Burdek
- Headquarters: Brussels, Belgium
- Key people: Bastien Sirodot (co-CEO); Laurent Jacobs (co-CEO)
- Number of employees: 200
- Website: www.umedia.eu

Umedia (formerly stylized uMedia) is an international film group based in Brussels, with offices in London, Paris, Los Angeles, and Vancouver.

== History ==
Nadia Khamlichi, Adrian Politowski and Jeremy Burdek created the Motion Investment Group in 2004 in Brussels. They set up the offices in the basement rooms of one of their friends' grandmothers. Their plan was to set up a fund using Belgium's tax shelter provisions for visiting productions. In 2010, the group rebranded as uMedia, with business divisions of "uFund (fundraising), uFilm (production and investment), uDream (distribution) and uFX (visual effects)." In 2011, its website reported it had staffed 75 employees, co-produced and financed 120 films, raised and invested 156 million euros. One of the film group's most notable financing at that time was for the 2011 film The Artist.

In 2013, Umedia expanded its operations to Los Angeles. In 2014, Burdek resigned. In 2016, Umedia set up an office in Vancouver.

In 2019, Khamlichi and Politowski co-founded and launched the production company Align Pictures, where Politowski plans to focus on producing fewer films but have more involvement in them. Politowski resigned from his position as co-CEO of the uMedia, leaving Khamlichi to remain as CEO. In 2020, Politowski sold his remaining stake in uMedia. and Khamlichi resigned as co-CEO. Bastien Sirodot, who had served as chief operating officer, became CEO. Laurent Jacobs, who joined Umedia as the chief financial officer in 2019, became co-CEO with Sirodot.

== Filmography ==
- A Girl from Mogadishu
- Apocalypse Clown
- Erased
- Grace of Monaco
- Night of the Zoopocalypse
- Sand Castle
- The Artist
- Vinyan
- What Happened to Monday
- Yves Saint Laurent
