= Grace of Monaco (film) =

2014 film directed by Olivier Dahan

- French theatrical release poster
- Directed by: Olivier Dahan
- Written by: Arash Amel
- Produced by: Arash Amel; Uday Chopra; Pierre-Ange Le Pogam
- Starring: Nicole Kidman; Tim Roth; Frank Langella; Parker Posey; Milo Ventimiglia; Derek Jacobi; Paz Vega
- Cinematography: Eric Gautier
- Edited by: Olivier Gajan
- Music by: Christopher Gunning
- Production companies: The Weinstein Company; YRF Entertainment; Stone Angels; Silver Reel; Wallonia; TF1 Film Production; Gaumont; Lucky Red; Od Shots; uMedia
- Distributed by: Gaumont (France); The Weinstein Company (United States); Entertainment One (Belgium); Lucky Red (Italy); Ascot Elite Entertainment Group (Switzerland)
- Release dates: May 14, 2014 (Cannes Film Festival); May 15, 2014 (Italy); May 21, 2014 (Belgium); May 25, 2015 (United States)
- Running time: 103 minutes
- Countries: France; United States; Belgium; Italy; Switzerland
- Languages: English; French
- Budget: $30 million
- Box office: $27.5 million

Grace of Monaco is a 2014 biographical drama film directed by Olivier Dahan and written by Arash Amel. The film stars Nicole Kidman in the title role as Grace Kelly, Princess of Monaco. It also features a supporting cast of Frank Langella, Parker Posey, Derek Jacobi, Paz Vega, Roger Ashton-Griffiths, Milo Ventimiglia, and Tim Roth.

Grace of Monaco is focused on former Hollywood star Grace Kelly's crisis of marriage and identity, during a dispute between Monaco's Prince Rainier III and France's President Charles de Gaulle in 1962, as well as her considering a return to Hollywood to film Alfred Hitchcock's Marnie.

Scheduled for release at the end of November 2013, the film was then rescheduled for March 14, 2014, until being pulled from the release schedule indefinitely. It opened the 2014 Cannes Film Festival, playing out of competition. It was released to cinemas in some countries in 2014, but bypassed a theatrical release in the US and ultimately debuted on the Lifetime cable network on May 25, 2015. The film was panned by critics.

== Plot ==
In 1962, several years after her departure from Hollywood in 1956, Alfred Hitchcock visits Princess Grace Kelly in Monaco with an invitation to return to Hollywood to star in his new film Marnie. The offer comes with a lucrative incentive of a million-dollar contract if she accepts his offer for the starring role. Grace is intrigued by the offer. Her role as the wife of a head of state has been limited in scope and dealing mostly with charity work for hospitals and humanitarian efforts. She asks her husband for permission and he initially appears to be agreeable to her taking the role if she wants the part.

In the meantime, tensions between France and Monaco are growing due to the dependence which France associates with the trade favors it has been offering to Monaco throughout the 20th century. France initiates diplomatic measures to get Monaco to accept a position of being a province within France, in the hope that Prince Rainier III will give up his sovereign control over Monaco. Rainier is reticent to accept any such offer. This, in turn, provokes France to begin initial steps toward a trade embargo against Monaco. The French government also initiates clandestine contact with close members of Rainier's family, namely his sister and her husband, to help expedite Rainier's capitulation to French demands in exchange for favors. The tensions also create differences in opinions of Rainier and Grace, which cause him to wish to take back his offer to allow her to accept the film offer from Hitchcock. Grace appears to need to take stock of her responsibilities and re-evaluate her priorities.

Grace decides to increase her concern for her participation in the improvement of local hospitals and Red Cross aid throughout Europe. So, she organizes a charity ball to take place in October for the purposes of fund raising and improving the prestige of Monaco in the process. Unexpectedly, Grace receives a report presenting photographic evidence that Rainier's sister has been covertly negotiating with France and de Gaulle against the interests of Rainier, which she promptly reports to Rainier. He denounces his sister's conduct and takes steps to have her exiled from Monaco by due process of law. Grace decides that the Hollywood offer is no longer a part of her life and no longer a viable option to her, given her new diplomatic and political responsibilities in Monaco. Her international charity ball for the Red Cross is a grand success and Monaco gains significant international political capital from the event, which allows Rainier and Grace to preserve the sovereignty of Monaco.

== Cast ==
- Nicole Kidman as Grace, Princess of Monaco
- Tim Roth as Rainier III, Prince of Monaco, Grace's husband and the Prince of Monaco
- Frank Langella as Father Francis Tucker
- Parker Posey as Madge Tivey-Faucon
- Milo Ventimiglia as Rupert Allen (publicist)
- Derek Jacobi as Count Fernando D'Ailieres
- Paz Vega as Maria Callas
- Geraldine Somerville as Princess Antoinette of Monaco
- Robert Lindsay as Aristotle Onassis
- Nicholas Farrell as Jean-Charles Rey
- Roger Ashton-Griffiths as Alfred Hitchcock, a Hollywood director who invitation Grace to return to screen
- Jeanne Balibar as Countess of Baciocchi
- Elizabeth Counsell as Princess Ghislaine of Monaco
- Yves Jacques as Mr. Delavenne
- Olivier Rabourdin as Emile Pelletier
- Flora Nicholson as Phyllis Blum
- André Penvern as Charles de Gaulle
- Philip Delancy as Robert McNamara
- Jean Dell as Denard
- Pascaline Crêvecoeur as Grace Kelly's dresser

== Production ==
=== Development ===
The script, written by Arash Amel, was listed in the 2011 Hollywood Black List of the most liked screenplays written in that year and sold to French-based producer Pierre-Ange Le Pogam in a competitive bid.

=== Filming ===
Principal photography began in September 2012 in Paris and Menton. In October 2012, the production moved to Italy, first to Grimaldi, the village near Ventimiglia, which bears the name of the royal house of Monaco, then in Mortola, near Ventimiglia at Villa Hanbury. The production was granted permission to close Monaco's main square for 24 hours between October 29–30, 2012, and during this time the cast were seen filming outside and around the Monte Carlo Casino. In November 2012 and, again, in January 2013, the production was in Genoa, Italy, on the housed set in the Royal Palace in Via Balbi, where the Hall of Mirrors replicates the residence of the royal court of Monaco. Interiors were shot in Belgium (Belgian parliament in Brussels, the city of Ghent and television studios in Lint.)

=== Grimaldi family's response ===
On January 16, 2013, shortly after filming ended, Prince Albert II, Princess Caroline and Princess Stéphanie (Kelly's children) criticized the subject matter of the approved script, describing it as "needlessly glamorized and historically inaccurate," and said that "numerous requests for changes" had been ignored, which "had caused much astonishment." The statement continued, "Therefore, the Royal Family wishes to stress that this film in no way constitutes a biopic. It recounts one rewritten, needlessly glamorized page in the history of Monaco and its family with both major historical inaccuracies and a series of purely fictional scenes."

In response to these criticisms, Melvyn Stokes from University College London said, "[T]he fact that their statement was issued before the film was even edited, let alone released, suggests that they may be opposed to any film about their mother". According to biographer Jeffrey Robinson, Princess Caroline was shown a script before filming, thought it was meant to be a comedy, then realized it was simply fiction. She went through the script with a red pen to correct things that were blatantly wrong, but Dahan was no longer interested and refused to make any changes.

Reviewing the film for History Extra, the official website of BBC History Magazine, Stokes said the film contains a number of historical inaccuracies, such as the suggestion that Grace's speech to the Red Cross Ball in Monaco on October 9, 1962, "defused the [tax] crisis". In reality, he points out, "its removal was the result of a compromise tax deal signed between France and Monaco that made French citizens who had lived in Monaco for less than five years, or companies doing more than a quarter of their business outside the principality, subject to French taxation." Stokes awarded the film one star for historical accuracy.

In an interview with French newspaper Le Figaro in December 2012, the film's star, Nicole Kidman, hinted that the film would be a character study, stating, "This is not a biopic or a fictionalized documentary of Grace Kelly, but only a small part of her life where she reveals her great humanity as well as her fears and weaknesses."

The production had previously asserted that the film does not purport to cover Grace Kelly's life, but a specific moment in her existence, and was filmed in Monaco with the support of the principality.

On January 19, 2013, director Olivier Dahan responded to the royal press release by stating, "I am not a journalist or historian. I am an artist. I have not made a biopic. I hate biopics in general. I have done, in any subjectivity, a human portrait of a modern woman who wants to reconcile her family, her husband, her career. But who will give up her career and invent another role. And it will be painful." He also stated, "I understand their point of view. After all, it is their mother. I do not want to provoke anyone. Only to say that it's cinema."

On May 2, 2014, the royal family released an official statement saying: "The Prince's Palace would like to reiterate that this feature film cannot under any circumstances be classified as a biopic."

=== Final cut ===
Dahan has been vocal on the final cut disagreements he has with the film's US distributor Harvey Weinstein. He told Libération, "It's right to struggle, but when you confront an American distributor like Weinstein, not to name names, there is not much you can do. Either you say, 'Go figure it out with your pile of shit' or you brace yourself so the blackmail isn't as violent … If I don't sign, that's where the out-and-out blackmail starts, but I could go that far. There are two versions of the film for now: mine and his … which I find catastrophic."

In April 2014, only two weeks before its opening night premiere at Cannes, Variety reported that Weinstein was considering dropping the film for US distribution. It was reported several weeks later that Weinstein had decided to keep the film. Weinstein said that the cut shown at Cannes was missing a key scene that would address the 'legitimate concerns' raised by the royal family over the depiction in Dahan's movie. Though Amel never publicly took a side in the long-running feud over final cut, he refused to attend the film's official photo call and press conference at the Cannes Film Festival for the director's cut being screened. According to Amel, the version that aired on Lifetime was a third edit.

=== Cannes controversy ===
At the 2014 Cannes Film Festival, notable absences at the press conference and official photo-call were Weinstein and the film's screenwriter Amel. Weinstein cited charitable work in Syria as the reason for his absence, while Amel told The Hollywood Reporter that "he doesn't want his 'big first Cannes moment' undermined by the controversy surrounding the dueling cuts."

== Release ==
=== Critical reception ===
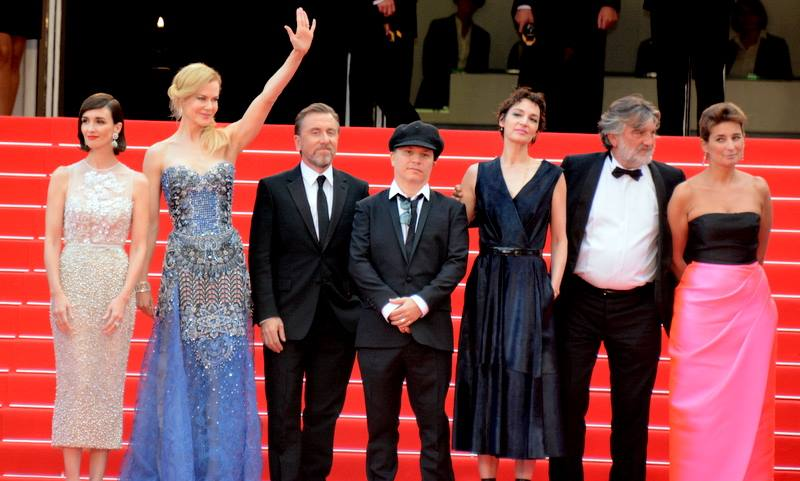
Director, producer and stars at the 2014 Cannes Film Festival.

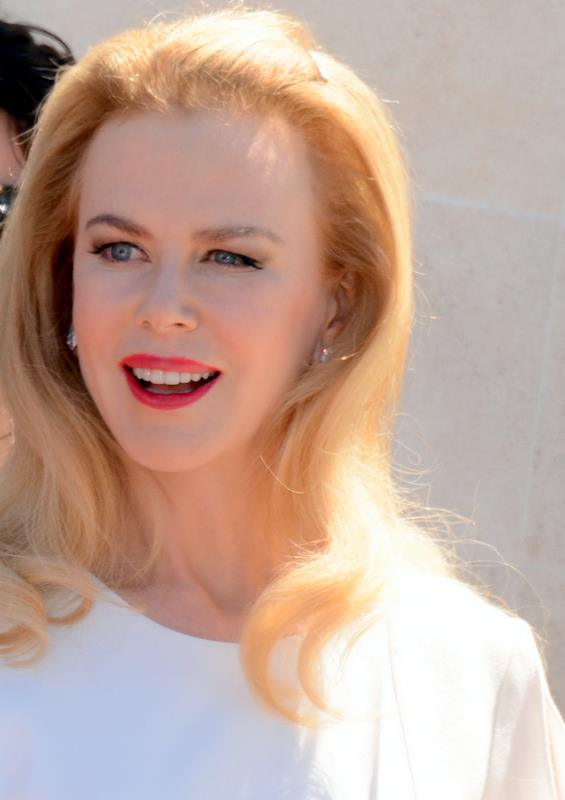
Star Nicole Kidman promoting the film at the Cannes Festival.

The film was overwhelmingly panned by critics. The film holds a 10% approval rating on Rotten Tomatoes, a review aggregator, based on 73 reviews, with an average rating of 3.26/10. The website's critical consensus reads: "Beautifully shot but utterly vapid, Grace of Monaco fails to honor either its subject or its audience." Metacritic reports an aggregated score of 21 out of 100 based on ten reviews, indicating "generally unfavorable" reviews.

Film critic Peter Bradshaw of The Guardian called it "a film so awe-inspiringly wooden that it is basically a fire-risk". Stephen Dalton, writing for The Hollywood Reporter, opined that "The Shrek movies deconstruct fairy tale conventions with much more depth and wit than this dreary parade of lifeless celebrity waxworks". Screen Daily's Fionnuala Halligan described the film as "puzzlingly misjudged... a minor royal Euro-pudding which lands awkwardly in sub-Roman Holiday territory".

Both Dahan's direction and Amel's script were heavily criticized. Guy Lodge of HitFix wrote, "If [Dahan] instructed [Kidman] at all, it was with sporadic, barking interjections from the spoken-word breakdown of Vogue". Scott Foundas of Variety wrote, "Amel's script is agonizingly airless and contrived." Robbie Collin of The Daily Telegraph referred to it as "thoroughly awful." Mark Kermode in The Guardian wrote, "The biggest problem is Arash Amel's script, which asks us to side with tax evaders and gamblers (Monaco did indeed incur a French blockade for tax-sheltering their billionaires), and to imagine that there is something beautiful and noble about allowing companies to shirk their revenue responsibilities. (Presumably the forthcoming DVD will be heavily promoted on Amazon?)". Kermode's review of Dahan's film was directly rebutted in a long defense of the movie by critic Brad Stevens in the British Film Institute's film magazine Sight & Sound, stating "The critical condescension that met Olivier Dahan's Grace of Monaco biopic shows tastemakers still struggling with ‘feminine’ cinema."

Kidman's performance as Kelly received mixed reviews. Geoffrey MacNab of The Independent wrote that "Kidman excels in a role in which she is called on to project glamour and suffering in equal measure – and is never allowed to be seen in the same outfit twice." Allan Hunter of the Daily Express also praised Kidman: "It is Nicole Kidman who dominates and the camera positively sighs with pleasure every moment she is on screen."

Scout Foundas of Variety, on the other hand, criticized Kidman's performance, summarizing that "the actress never appears to fully connect with the character, delivering a series of doleful little-girl-lost poses — and, later, pantomimed iron-jawed determination." Dave Calhoun of Time Out London shared the same sentiments saying, "Kidman's breathless, blank performance does little to add life or credibility to a script that, looking on the bright side, might have audiences giggling for years to come."

Roth's performance was mostly criticized. Stephen Dalton of The Hollywood Reporter said, "Tim Roth never convinces as Rainier, chain-smoking through every scene with a pained frown suggesting mild constipation."

=== "Writer's Cut" ===
In January 2015, Harvey Weinstein clarified the events leading to the conflict between himself and the director. He indicated that the US release would be a "Writer's Cut", restoring the movie to the spirit of the screenplay The Weinstein Company signed on for, which he compared to The King's Speech. He said, "The writer, Arash Amel, called me and said, what happened to my script. It’s like welcome to Hollywood. Writers don’t have any say, but we decided to pair him up with a team of people and see what he could do about restoring the movie to the way it looked when he wrote it. He did a wonderful job."

== Awards and nominations ==
Award	Category	Recipient	Result
Primetime Emmy Awards	Outstanding Television Movie	Grace of Monaco	Nominated
Primetime Emmy Awards	Outstanding Hairstyling for a Limited Series or Movie	Agathe Dupuis and Silvine Picard	Nominated
Screen Actors Guild Awards	Outstanding Performance by a Female Actor in a Miniseries or Television Movie	Nicole Kidman	Nominated
