= Chris Greenhalgh =

British novelist, screenwriter, teacher and poet

Chris Greenhalgh is a British novelist, screenwriter, and poet.

== Life ==
Chris Greenhalgh was born in 1963 and brought up in Manchester. After studying English Literature at university, he lived and worked for five years in Italy and Athens. Upon his return to England, he completed his doctoral thesis on the poetry of Frank O'Hara. He has since pursued a twin career as a writer and educator. He has published two novels, three books of poetry and a successful film script, and has taught in Athens and at Sevenoaks School, where he was Academic Deputy Head. More recently he was Principal of Southbank International School, London, and from 2015 until 2024 Principal and CEO of The British School of Milan (Sir James Henderson), stepping down to devote himself full-time to writing.

== Works ==
=== Novels ===
Coco and Igor was first published in the UK in 2002 by Headline Review and has since been translated into a dozen languages, including French, Russian, Polish, Greek, and Chinese. The novel is based on the secret affair between Coco Chanel and Igor Stravinsky in Paris in 1920.

Greenhalgh’s second novel, Seducing Ingrid Bergman, is set in Paris and Hollywood, after the end of the Second World War and tells the story of Ingrid Bergman and war photographer Robert Capa's intense and ultimately tragic relationship.

=== Film scripts ===
Greenhalgh has written a screenplay adapting his novel Coco and Igor. The film Coco Chanel & Igor Stravinsky, directed by Jan Kounen and starring Anna Mouglalis and Mads Mikkelsen held the prestigious closing slot at the 2009 Cannes Film Festival selected Coco Chanel & Igor Stravinsky to be shown in its prestigious closing slot, on 24 May 2009.

His second novel was optioned in 2014 by YRF, then Fox Disney, and a new option is currently being negotiated.

=== Poetry ===
Greenhalgh has published three volumes of poetry, all with Bloodaxe Books.

- Stealing the Mona Lisa (1994)
- Of Love, Death and the Sea-Squirt (2000)
- The Invention of Zero (2007)

== Prizes and awards ==
- Eric Gregory Award for poetry from the Society of Authors (1992)
