= Asset-backed securities index =

An asset-backed securities index is a curated list of asset-backed security exposures that is used for performance bench-marking or trading.

The original asset-backed securities index was the ABX, a synthetic tradeable index sponsored by Markit (now IHS Markit), which referenced a basket of 20 subprime mortgage-backed securities.

== History ==
On 17 January 2006, CDS Indexco and Markit launched ABX.HE, a subprime mortgage backed credit derivative index on home equity loans as assets, with plans to extend the index to other underlying assets, such as Credit Cards (ABX.CC), Student Loans (ABX.SL) and Auto Loans (ABX.AU). In a marketing presentation CDS IndexCo was described as the owner of the DJ CDX family of credit default swap (CDS) indices formed from a merger of the major CDS indices (iBoxx and Trac-X) in April 2004. It introduced a "second generation product such as index tranches and index options."

They launched the Home Equity (ABX.HE) ABX on 19 January 2006. Advertised daily prices were availability on the Markit website. The purpose of the indices was to allow investors to trade exposures to the subprime market without holding the actual asset backed securities. The ABX.HE Index was created from "qualifying deals of 20 of the largest sub-prime home equity ABS shelf programs from the six month period preceding the roll." The market makers of ABX.HE were listed as Goldman Sachs, JPMorgan, Deutsche Bank, Barclays Capital, Bank of America, BNP Paribas, Citigroup, Credit Suisse, Lehman Brothers, Merrill Lynch, RBS Greenwich, UBS and Wachovia.

These investment firms had anticipated the subprime mortgage crisis. In 2006, Wall Street had introduced a new index, called the ABX, that became a way to invest in the direction of mortgage securities. The index allowed traders to bet on or against pools of mortgages with different risk characteristics, just as stock indexes enable traders to bet on whether the overall stock market, or technology stocks or bank stocks, will go up or down."

Beginning in 2004, with housing prices soaring and the mortgage mania in full swing, Mr. Egol began creating the deals known as Abacus. From 2004 to 2008, Goldman issued 25 Abacus deals, according to Bloomberg, with a total value of $10.9 billion. According to a New York Times article Goldman Sachs's trader Jonathan M. Egol created's Abacus mortgage-backed CDOs, collateralized debt obligations (CDOs), beginning in 2004, with housing prices soaring and the mortgage mania in full swing. Goldman Sachs sold them to investors, and then bet short against them.

On 14 November 2007, Markit acquired International Index Company and agreed to acquire CDS IndexCo.

According to a New York Times article, Goldman Sachs used an ABX index to bet against (i.e. short) the housing market in 2006. It also "began marketing short bets using the ABX index to hedge funds like Paulson & Company, Magnetar, and Soros Fund Management."

On Saturday/Sunday, November 5–6, 2011 in "Prime Signs of Pain Emerge", the Wall Street Journal offered an extensive and literate discussion of fall of the "PrimeX Index" which (to paraphrase the WSJ) focuses on "prime-mortgage bonds" that are "supposed to be of high quality". WSJ Author suggested that "Prime Mortgages" are now in increasingly deep trouble which portends a collapse in the value those securities thus mirroring the earlier collapse of subprime mortgages. Katy pointed out that just as John Paulson bet against subprime mortgages (presumably in 2006–2008), a new class of speculators and hedgers are now lining up to bet that homeowners with prime-mortgages will walk away from their houses as their values go "under water".

== List of ABS indices ==
- ABX.HE
- Bloomberg Barclays Fixed Income ABS Indices
- Bank of America Merrill Lynch US Fixed & Floating Rate Asset Backed Securities Indices

== See also ==
- Asset-backed security
- Subprime mortgage crisis

== Similar indices ==
- Credit default swap index
