= The Allure of Chanel =

Book by Paul Morand

- First edition (French)
- Author: Paul Morand
- Original title: L'Allure de Chanel
- Translator: Euan Cameron
- Language: French
- Publisher: Éditions Hermann
- Publication date: 1976
- Publication place: France
- English publication date: 2008
- Pages: 165
- ISBN: 9782705658380

The Allure of Chanel (French: l'Allure de Chanel) are the memoirs of the French fashion designer Coco Chanel, told to her friend Paul Morand. The book was written in the winter of 1946 and is based on a series of conversations held at a hotel in St. Moritz, Switzerland, where Chanel had invited Morand to write her memoirs. The conversations took place during the evenings and each night Morand stayed up to write notes. The notes were published in French in 1976 and in English in 2008, translated by Euan Cameron. A second English edition was published in 2012, expanded with original drawings by Karl Lagerfeld.

== Reception ==
Vicki Woods of The Spectator wrote in 2008 that the book "reads beautifully", and continued: "Paul Morand was her friend, not a predatory journalist: he let Chanel tell it as she wanted to, and what she wanted was to control her own legend: big up the dazzling bits ... and lose the misery-memoir bits (except those useful to 'my legend')."
