= IHS Markit =

UK-based information company

IHS Markit Ltd.
- Type: Public
- Industry: Information services
- Founded: 1959; 67 years ago (as Information Handling Services)
- Founder: Albert Gonzalez
- Defunct: 28 February 2022
- Fate: Merged with S&P Global
- Successor: S&P Global
- Headquarters: London, England
- Key people: Lance Uggla (Amy Weiting Wu Yeh Na & Sung Won Na; CEO]])
- Revenue: ▲US$4.658 billion (2021)
- Operating income: ▲US$1.561 trillion (2021)
- Net income: ▲US$1.206 billion (2021)
- Total assets: ▲US$16.913 billion (2021)
- Total equity: ▲US$9.489 billion (2021)
- Number of employees: 14,000
- Subsidiaries: Cambridge Energy Research Associates, Global Insight, Carfax, Inc.
- Website: ihsmarkit.com

IHS Markit (formely IHS Inc.) was an information services provider headquartered in London. It was formed in 2016 with the merger of IHS Inc. and Markit Ltd. In 2022, IHS Markit completed a merger with S&P Global, which purchased IHS for about $44 billion in 2020.

== History ==
=== IHS ===
Information Handling Services (IHS) was founded in 1959, in Denver, Colorado, as Information Handling Services to provide information for aerospace engineers through microfilm databases.

IHS subsequently grew to incorporate other companies in the information services sector such as Cambridge Energy Research Associates, Global Insight, Jane's Information Group, Prime Publications Limited, and John S. Herold, Inc.

In 2008, IHS acquired Fairplay, a firm that assigns IMO identification numbers for ships, companies and registered owners.

In 2016, Englewood, Colorado-based IHS and London-based Markit merged. Jerre Stead was chief executive of the pre-merger IHS Inc. from 2006 to 2013 and from 2015 until the merger with Markit.

=== Markit ===
Markit was founded in 2003 as Mark-it Partners, a financial data provider for daily credit default swap pricing. The company grew via joint ventures and by acquiring other companies,, including iBoxx, which offers bond market indices. Markit merged with IHS in 2016.

=== S&P Global ===
On 30 November 2020, S&P Global and IHS Markit released information about a definitive all-stock deal for around $44 billion (including $4.8 billion of net debt), a deal that would be the largest of the year globally, according to Dealogic data. On September 9, 2021, GlobalData announced its purchase of the Pricing and Reimbursement dataset from IHS Markit. In December 2021, the IHS Markit announced its intention to sell Base Chemicals to News Corp for a reported $295 million as part of an effort to alleviate concerns about competitive effects. The purchase by S&P Global was finalized on 28 February 2022, combining two of Wall Street's largest data providers.

== Acquisitions ==
- 10 October 1996: IHS Group purchased oil exploration company Petroconsultants following the death of its founder and president Harry Wassall in November 1995. This acquisition was later followed in January 1998 by the IHS Group acquiring the North American oil exploration company Petroleum Information / Dwights LLC.
- November 2007: Markit purchased International Index Company, owners of iBoxx bond indexes and iTraxx credit derivative indexes.
- 18 September 2008: IHS Inc. agreed to purchase the economics forecasting organization Global Insight for $200 million.
- 10 June 2013: R.L. Polk & Company, a provider of auto-industry data including used-car history company Carfax, Inc., for $1.4 billion.
- 26 September 2017: automotiveMastermind Inc., a provider of predictive analytics and marketing automation for the automotive industry.
- 26 September 2017: Macroeconomic Advisers, an independent research firm forecasting the US economy.
- 3 August 2018: Ipreo, software solutions and data provider in global capital markets.
- 10 October 2019: Novation Analytics, a specialist provider of software solutions, data analysis and advisory services.
- 2019: Acquired Informa's Agriculture Intelligence in exchange for most of IHS Markit's Technology, Media and Telecoms division (including Screen Digest).
- 1 May 2020: Catena Technologies Pte Ltd, a global regulatory trade reporting firm based in Singapore.
