= Skanste =

Neighborhood of Riga, Latvia

Coordinates: 56°58′13″N 24°07′06″E

- Neighborhood of Riga
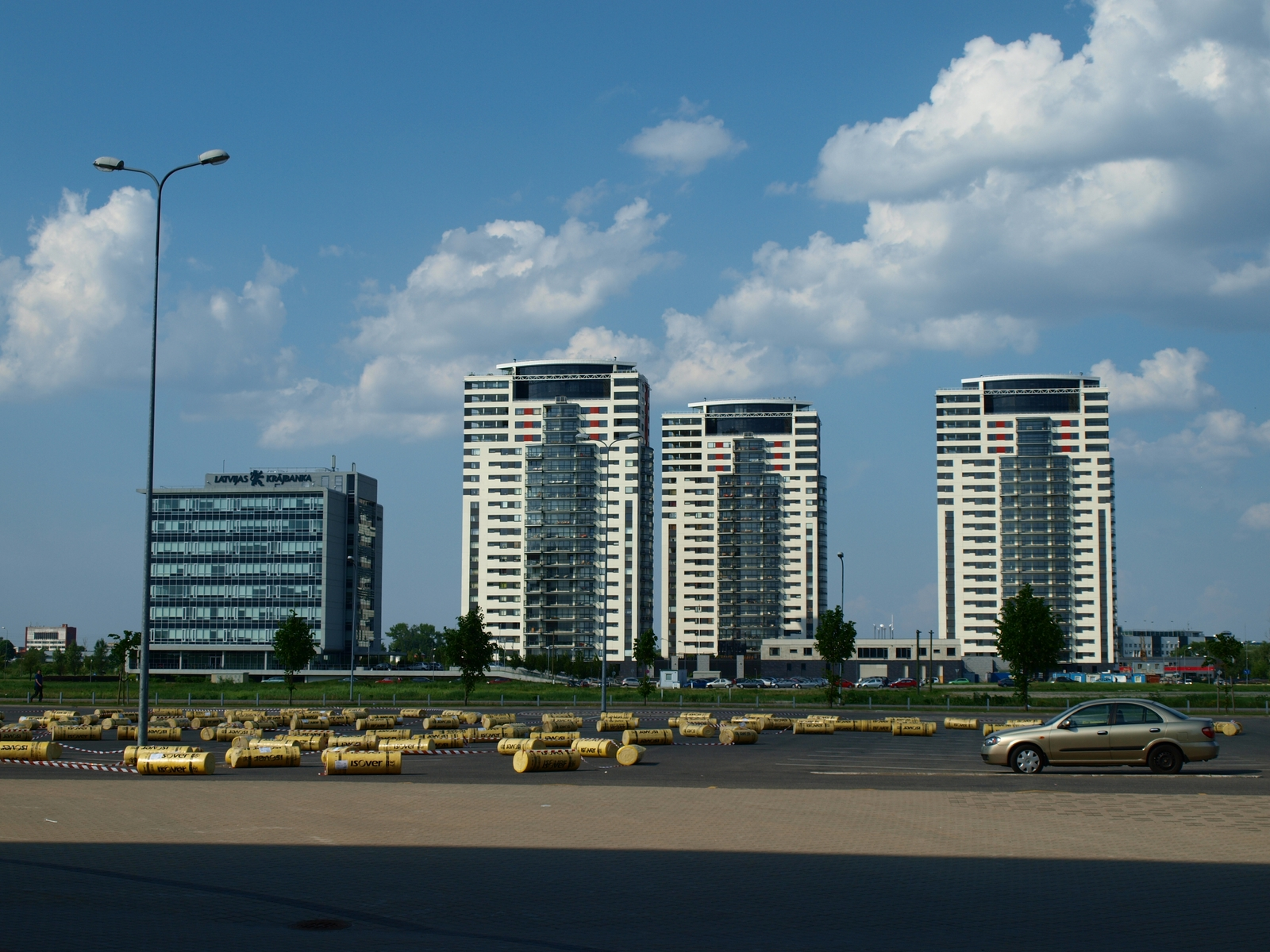
- Skanstes virsotnes housing project

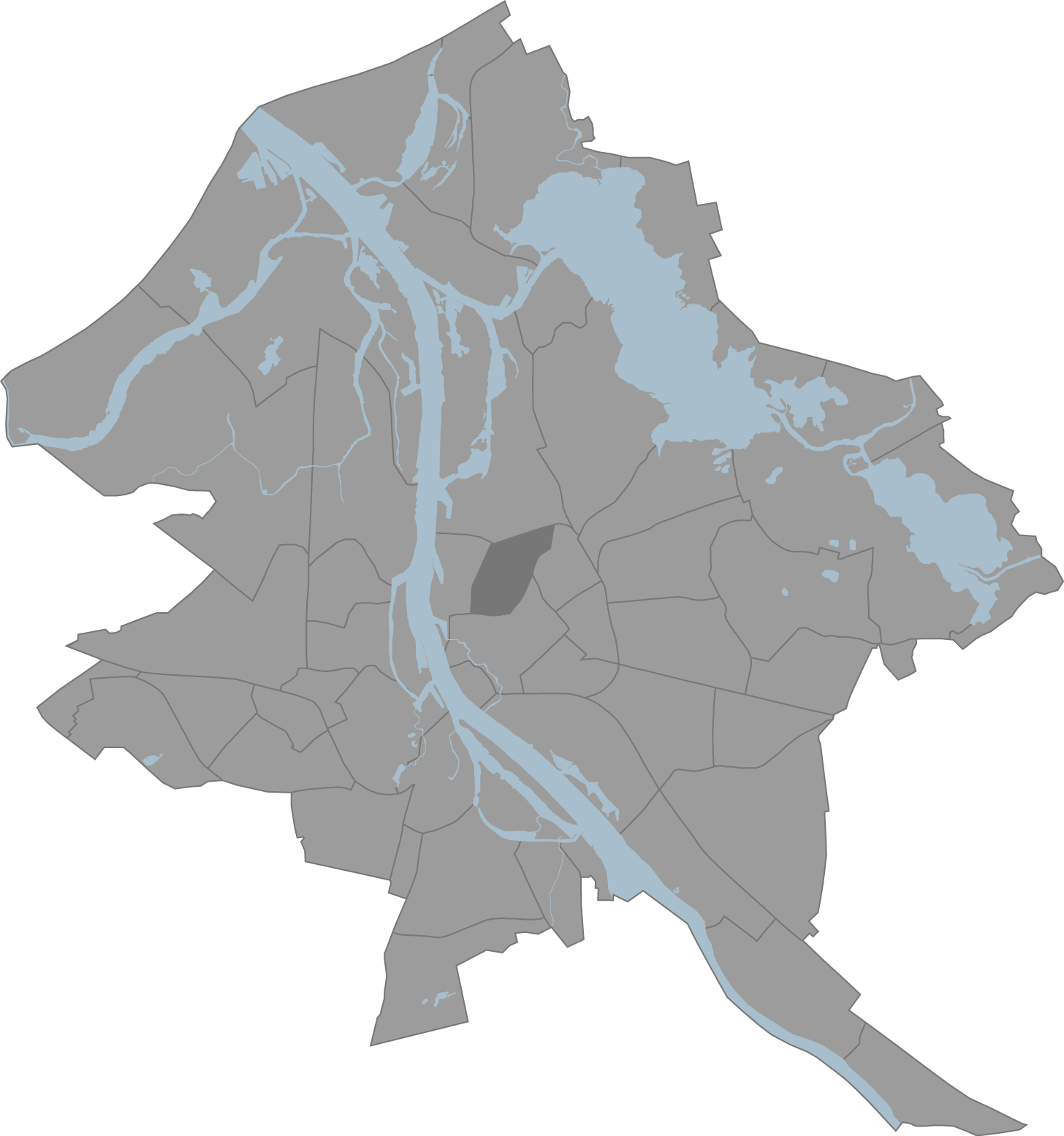
- Location in Riga
- Country: Latvia
- City: Riga
- District: Vidzeme Suburb; Northern District

Area
  - Total: 2.148 km^{2} (0.829 sq mi)

Population (2017)
  - Total: 1,091
  - Density: 507.9/km^{2} (1,315/sq mi)
- Postal codes: LV-1013, LV-1045
- Website: skanste.lv

Skanste is a neighbourhood located in the center of Riga, the capital of Latvia. Geographically, the neighborhood is situated in the northern part of the railway ring on the right bank of the Daugava, bordering the Sarkandaugava, Brasa, Centrs, and Pētersala-Andrejsala neighborhoods.

Skanste is considered part of the compact center of Riga. The neighborhood's central traffic artery is Skanstes Street, but the area is delineated by Pulkveža Brieža, Hanzas, Vesetas, and Duntes streets, as well as Ganību dambis, and the railroad.

The area that for decades was allotted for kitchen garden plots, has now been developed to include office towers, sports infrastructure complexes and residential buildings. Next to the historical heart of Riga and its so-called "quiet center", Skanste is developing as a contemporary neighborhood, attractive both to city residents and entrepreneurs and fosters Riga's competitiveness regionally and in the European context. Skanste continues to grow and there are several plans that will be implemented in the coming years.

The Skanste neighborhood takes up 215 hectares (530 acres) measuring by perimeter, and its border is more than six kilometers (4 miles) long. Currently, more than 12,000 people live or work in Skanste, and if large-scale plans for the neighborhood are carried out, these numbers could exceed 42 thousand. On average, the Elektrum Olympic Center and Arena Riga receive 1.9 million visitors a year. When the Metta Youth Football Education Center, a multifunctional private clinic, the Riga Conference, the Concert Center and other projects come to fruition, the annual number of Skanste visitors will grow to 3 million people.

== Skanste 2030 ==
In the Riga city development strategy for up to 2030, Skanste has been defined as a priority territory for development with the creation of a central business district, a congress center and a new tram line.

Urban planning for the Skanste neighborhood focuses on expanding Riga's central business district while integrating new residential and cultural infrastructure.

The neighborhood has been designated as a priority area for development. Currently, Skanste is the only and largest partially developed territory in the center of the city. The Riga City Council received a letter from the Environmental Protection and Regional Development Ministry with a permission to begin implementing the local planning of the territory.

The Skanste Development Agency document, as well as those for city development, provide for Skanste to fit in well with the compact center of Riga as its most modern part. If, in the historical and "quiet" parts of the center all buildings and infrastructure are historical and all efforts are expent to maintain or renovate the buildings, then Skanste is a free territory in the center of the city where a functioning modern district can be developed.

The Skanste development territory has been included in the spatial nucleus of Riga with a compact type of occupancy. Since most jobs are located in the city center, the development plans include constructing residential buildings as close as possible to this part of the capital.

The other direction of development regards office space. Skanste is a location for international business service centers, representing international enterprises or branches set up for particular functions with competitive salary schemes. 10,000 jobs are scheduled to be created in this sector in the next four years.

== Investments in the Skanste neighbourhood ==
Members of the Skanste Development Agency have already made investments and in the future the amount of investment will continue to grow. The local government plans to develop this neighborhood in synergy with entrepreneurs. Infrastructure will be built by attracting EU money, and entrepreneurs will develop their projects.

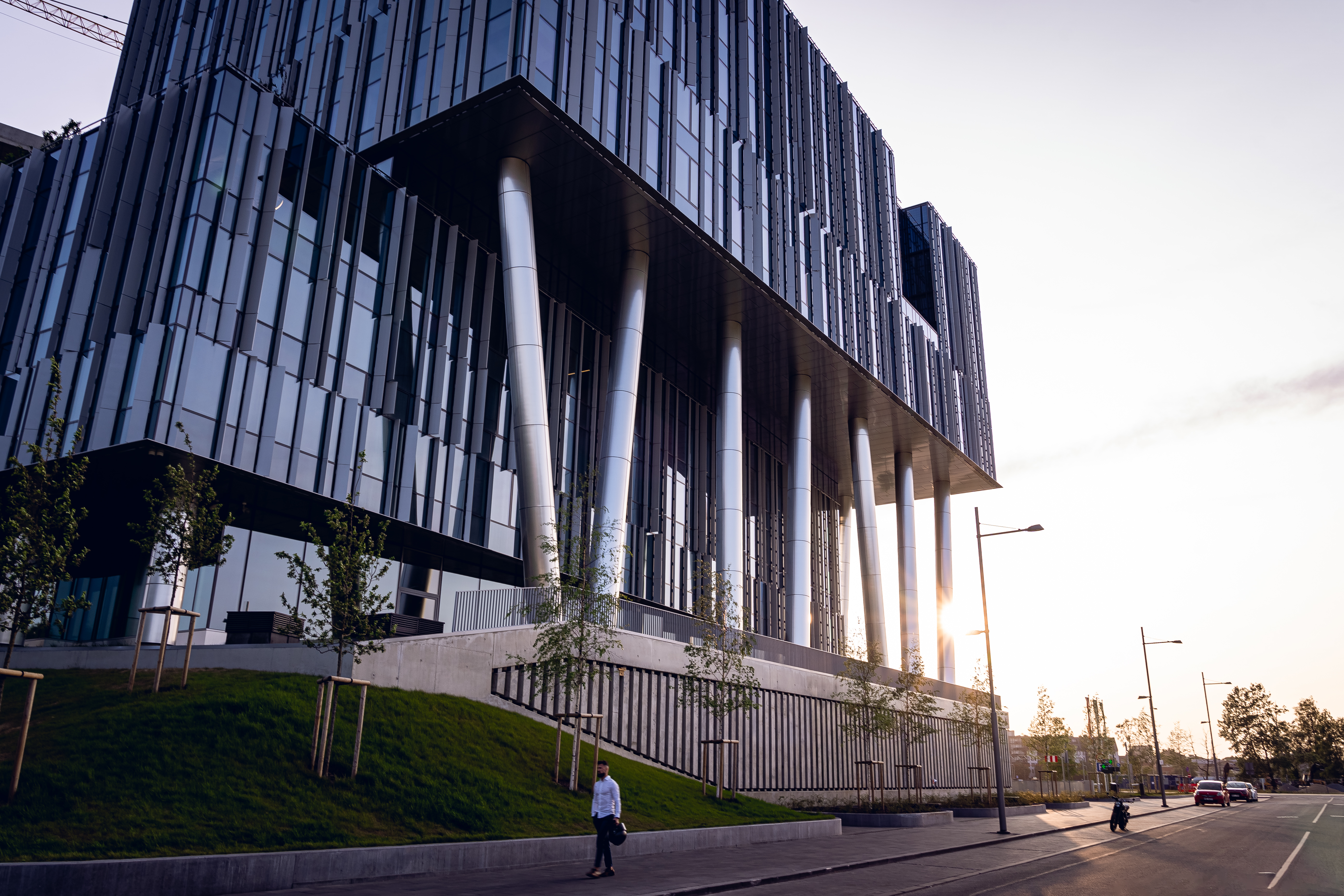
Verde business centre

By 2018, investments in Skanste amounted to €300 million. By 2024, this amount is projected to increase to about €800 million, including building a conference and concert center (with planned annual attendance of ~ 600,000), a multifunctional private clinic (with planned annual attendance of ~ 250,000), developing an internationally oriented innovation and gastronomy quarter 'Sporta 2' and the FS METTA Youth Football Education Center (with planned annual attendance of ~ 150,000), as well as office and residential buildings. The Riga City Council is planning to attract European funding to build the infrastructure, including the much discussed new tram line, which will connect the Skanste neighborhood to the city center: it is expected that the cost for building the tram line will be €100 million, and €7 million for streets and parks.

Altogether, it is planned to invest €900 million in the development of the Skanste neighborhood: one of the largest real estate investment objects.

== Skanste today ==
Next to the historical and "quiet" centers, Skanste is developing as the modern part of the capital. The neighborhood that covers over 200 ha (490 acres) already houses the central offices of several banks, and new apartment and office buildings.

Pillar Offices

Pillar is one of the leading real estate companies in Latvia. Pillar develops, manages, rents, and sells all types of real estate: apartment buildings, individual flats, individual houses, and commercial houses primarily in Riga and its surrounding areas and Jūrmala. Pillar's temporary office is the first building finished in New Hanza, the business quarter under development.

kim? Contemporary Art Center

kim? Contemporary Art Center was established in 2009. Its name is an abbreviation of the perpetual question “what is art”? For more than nine years, kim? has been one of the leading contemporary art institutions, offering exhibitions, lectures, discussions, publications, and educational programs for various audiences. With its activities kim? tries to support and foster the creative careers of the younger generation artists, theoreticians, curators, translators, and thinkers.

Since 2009, kim? has organized over 150 exhibitions of Latvian and foreign artists and held lectures, seminars, readings, and performances for various interested audiences. Exhibitions and the program of related activities are developed through collaboration with guest curators and other institutions. At the end of 2010, work was begun on a long-term project: creating texts and translations on art theory and criticism, as well as publishing other printed media.

TechHub

TechHub Riga is a shared technology space, which was established in 2012 as an incubator. TechHub organizes a series of events, including the monthly Meetup, TechHub Academy, as well as the new technology conference TechChill

Rietumu Banka

AS Rietumu Banka is one of the largest banks in the Baltic region, specializing in servicing large businesses and wealthy individuals. Rietumu Capital Centre, the central offices of AS Rietumu Banka, is one of the most modern business centers in the Baltics, for which the architectural firm Zenico projekts received the Riga Architecture Annual Prize 2010. This multi-storey building is the first A+++ class office complex in Latvia. Rietumu Capital Centre is formed by three interconnected towers of different heights and a multi-level parking garage. The roof of the building has a helicopter pad and a wide terrace with a garden.

Jupiter Centre

An A-class business center. A 14-storey building with a two-level parking garage for 160 cars. The building was unveiled in 2012. It is an energy efficient and comfortable business environment. Developer: SIA Development Projects.

Arena Riga

Arena Riga was opened in February 2006, attracting thousands of hockey fans for the World Hockey Championship games. It is the largest venue in Riga, popular both among locals and visitors from the neighboring countries. The technical facilities and the team of professionals means that Arena Riga can accommodate any top level event: concerts, shows, performances, hockey, basketball, volleyball, tennis or corporate gatherings. The audience capacity is from 2000 to 13,486: 10,226 for a hockey game, 11,200 for basketball, and 9,857 to 13,486 for social events. Arena Riga has been the venue for All-European sports events (both Men's and Women's European Basketball Championships, Davis Cup in tennis, etc.), as well as concerts by world class musicians: as well as concerts by world class musicians: Depeche Mode, Robbie Williams, Sting, Kylie Minogue, Rihanna, Muse and many others. Arena Riga is the home base for the KHL Dinamo Riga hockey club and the VEF Riga basketball club, which takes part in the VTB league tournament and is a multiple Latvia champion.

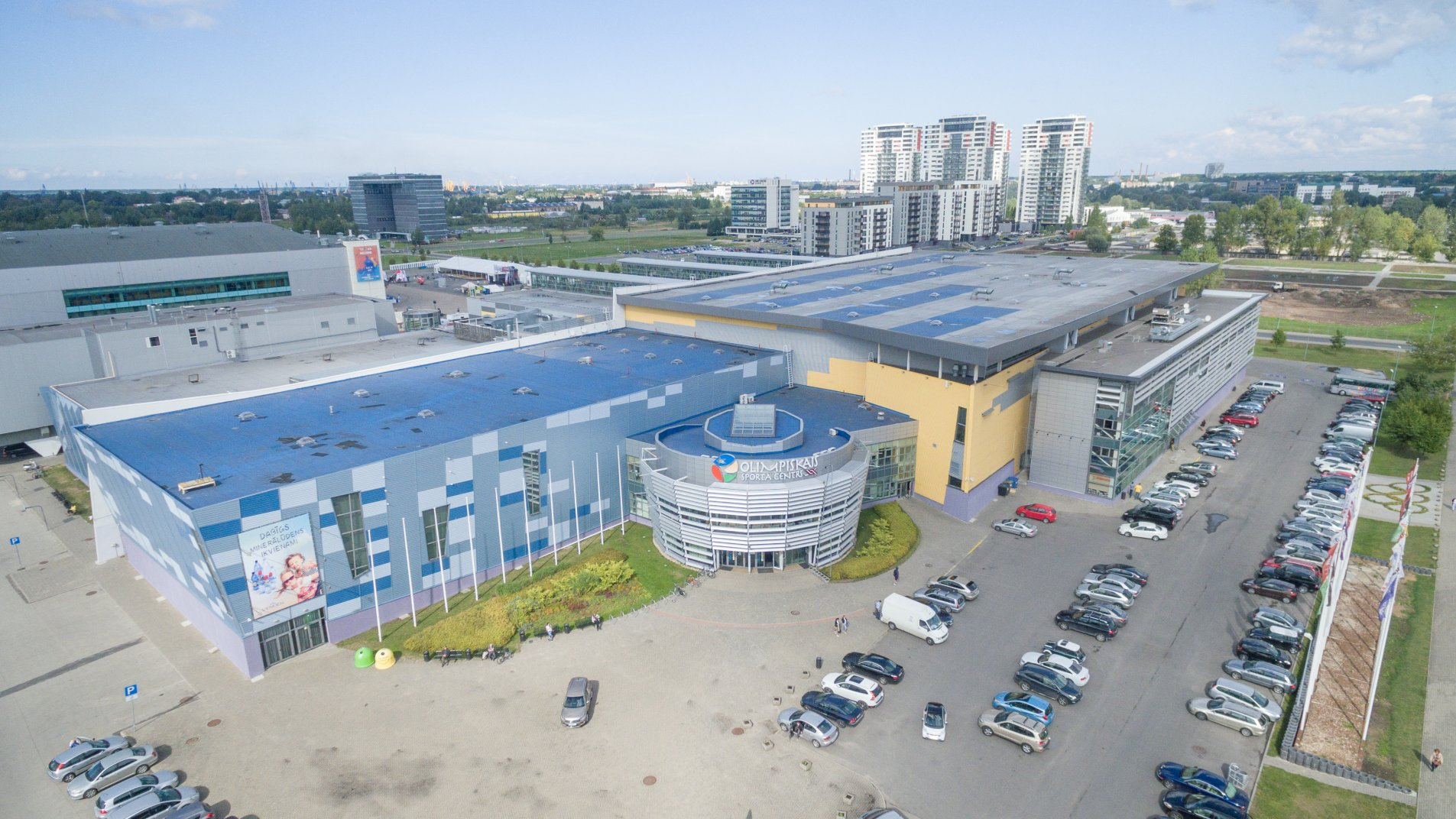
Elektrum Olympic Center

Where once the Riga race course used to be, now sporting and other kind of events take place. For instance, in 2006 this was the venue for the NATO summit, the annual Lattelecom Riga Marathon participants registered here, and participants in the World Choir Olympics and Latvian Song Festival recently took their brief hours of rest.

The Elektrum Olympic Center was unveiled in 2005; it takes up 23,924.63 m^{2} (5.91190 acres) and has more than 1.3 million visitors per year. In 2017, 3.2 million euro was invested for a large scale reconstruction and modernization, which was completed at the beginning of 2018.

METTA Football School

The METTA Football School was established in 2006 to create an infrastructure and versatile football environment for raising educated professionals. Within 10 years, FS METTA has created a system in which over 850 youths, ages 4–18 are active, as well as the adult team FK METTA/Latvijas Universitāte, which plays in the highest Latvian football league. Riga City Council has repeatedly recognized METTA as the "best youth sports organization in Riga", and the Latvian Football Federation has deemed METTA the best Latvian football academy.

Luminor Central Office

Luminor is a modern financial service provider in Estonia, Latvia, and Lithuania, combining business savvy with an understanding of the local market and the needs of its clients. On the basis of the experience of two leading Nordic banks, Nordea and DNB. Luminor is the third largest financial service provider in the Baltic countries, with 16% of the market in deposits and 23% in lending. Launching its operations in the Baltics, the Luminor client portfolio includes 1.3 million private individuals and businesses, as well as 3000 employees.

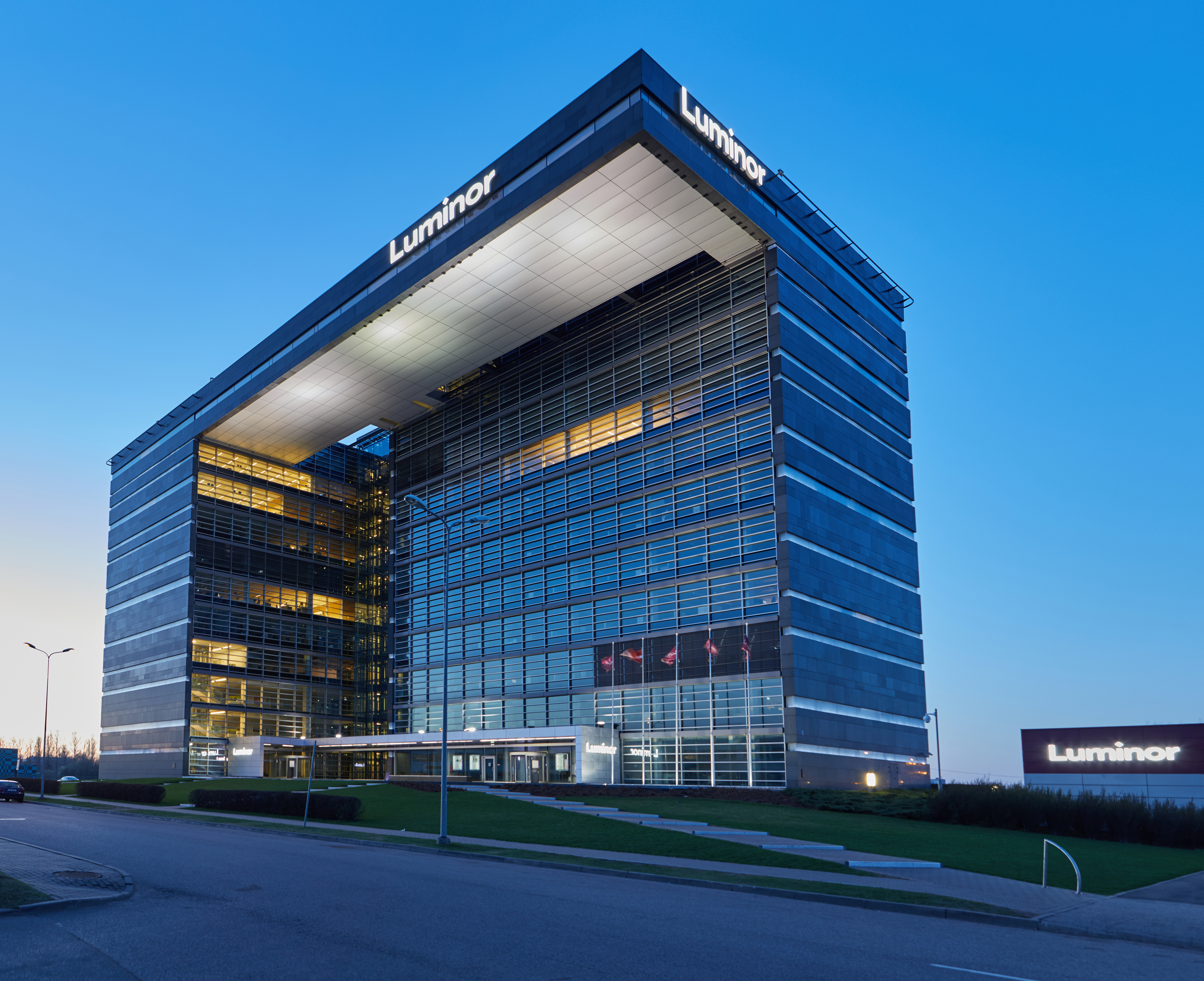
Luminor Bank

Duntes Nami

Duntes Nami is a modern six-storey class-A office building put into operation in 2007 and has been rented out to different businesses. Design: SIA Projektēšanas birojs ARHIS.

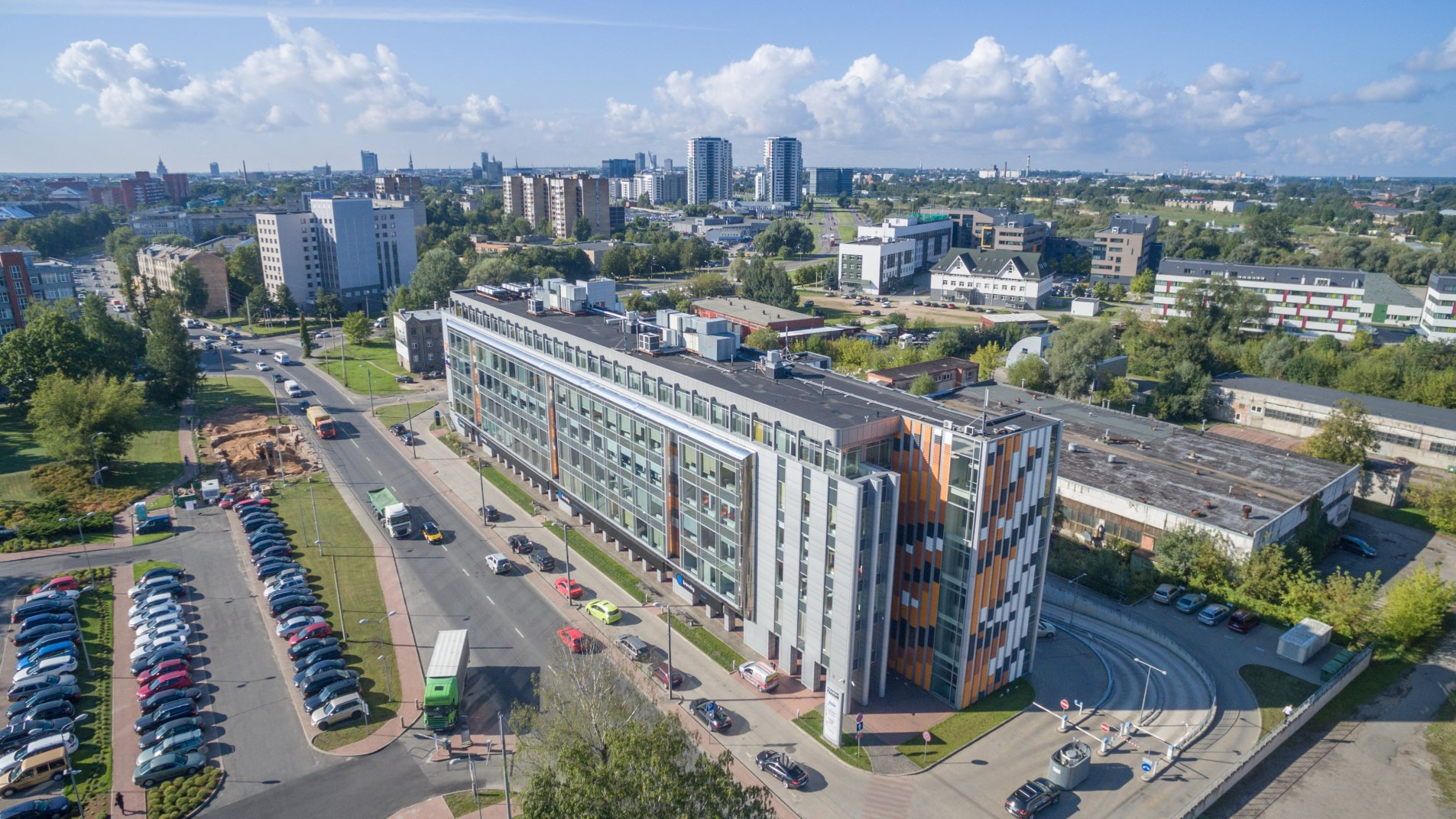
Duntes nami

Sports Residence

The class-A two-storey office building with guarded parking lot was reconstructed in 2011, when the latest security, energy efficiency and climate control systems were installed. The building is characterized by laconic architecture and high quality finish. The LNK Centre main offices used to be located there, but since moving to Jānis Daliņš iela 15, the building is available for commercial renting.

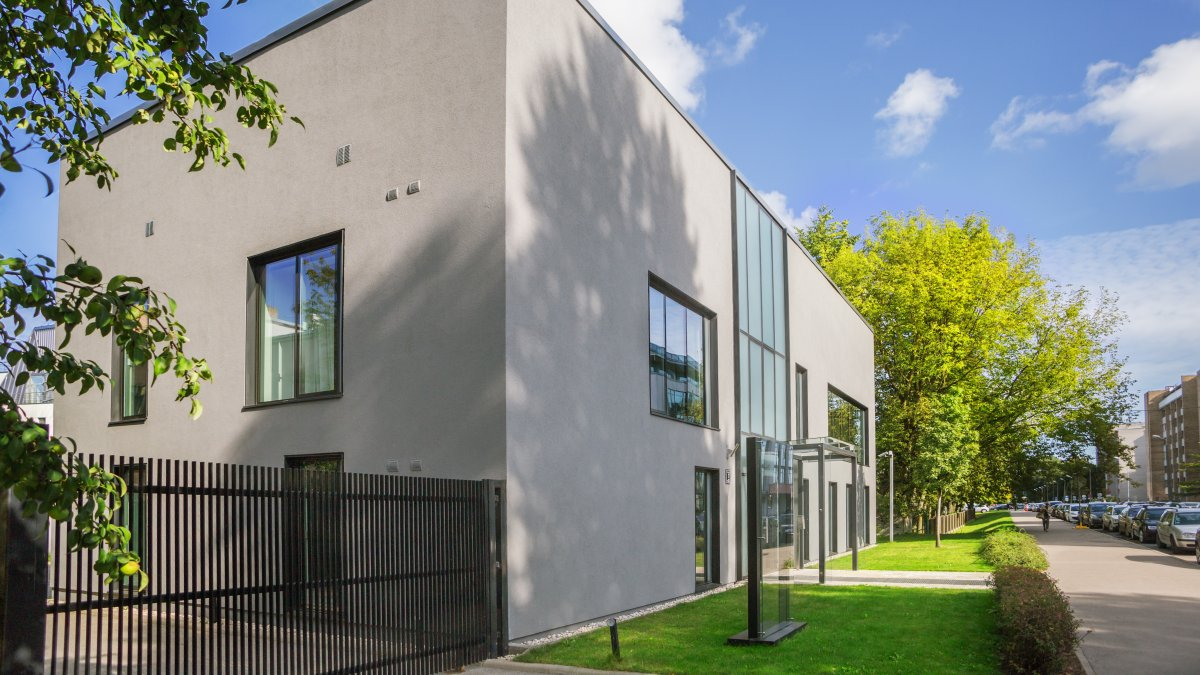
Sports Residence

Skanstes Virsotnes

Skanstes Virsotnes is one of the most modern residential building complexes in Latvia, consisting of four 24-storey buildings. Design: KVA Architects, Finland; developer and general contractor: construction company Merks, Latvia.

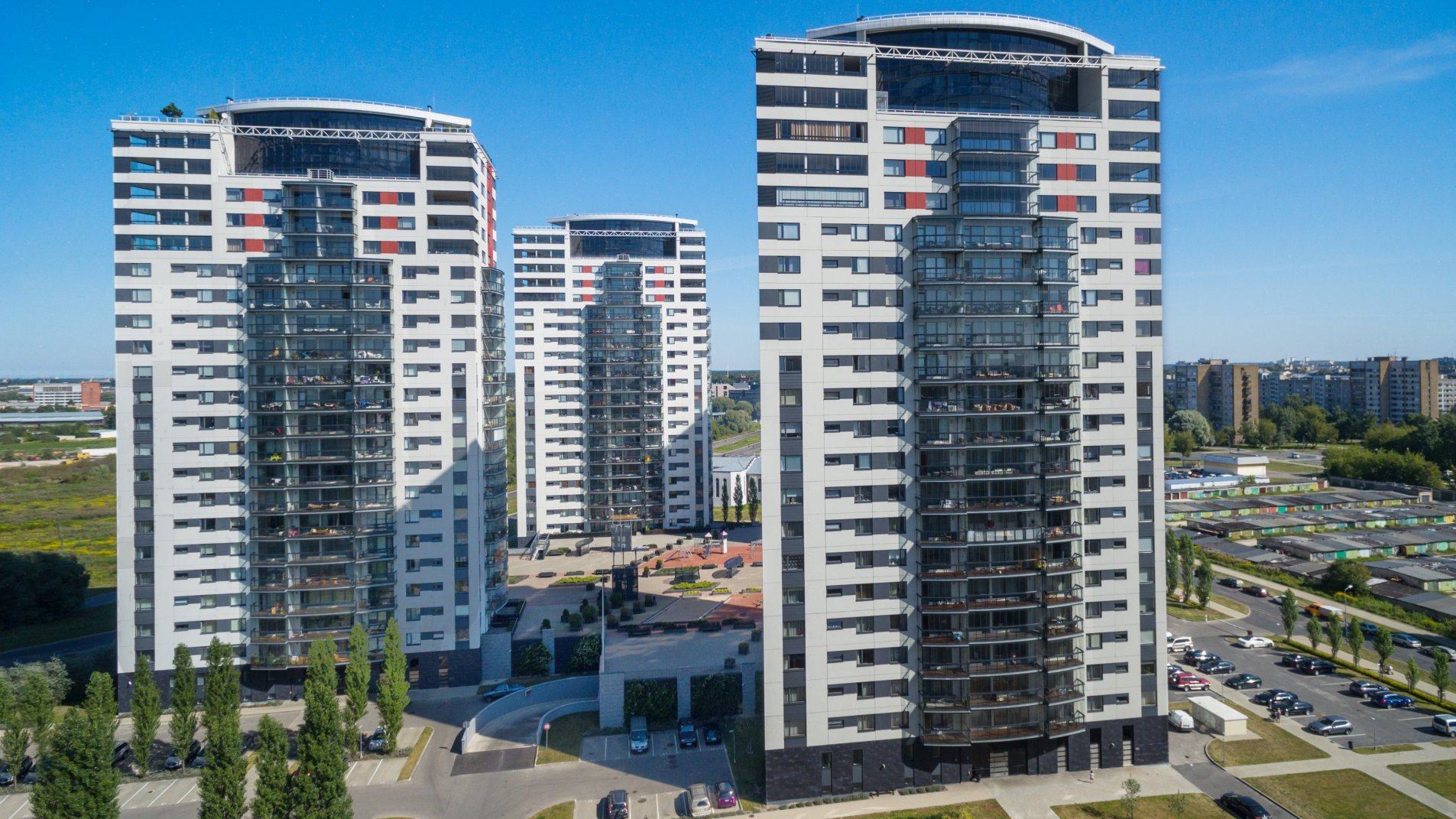
Skanstes virsotnes

Skanstes Mājas

Skanstes Mājas is a residential complex located next to Skanstes Virsotnes. It consists of three separate buildings with apartments, whose footage varies from 50 to 150 m^{2} (540 to 1,610 sq ft). Developer and general contractor: construction company Merks, Latvia.

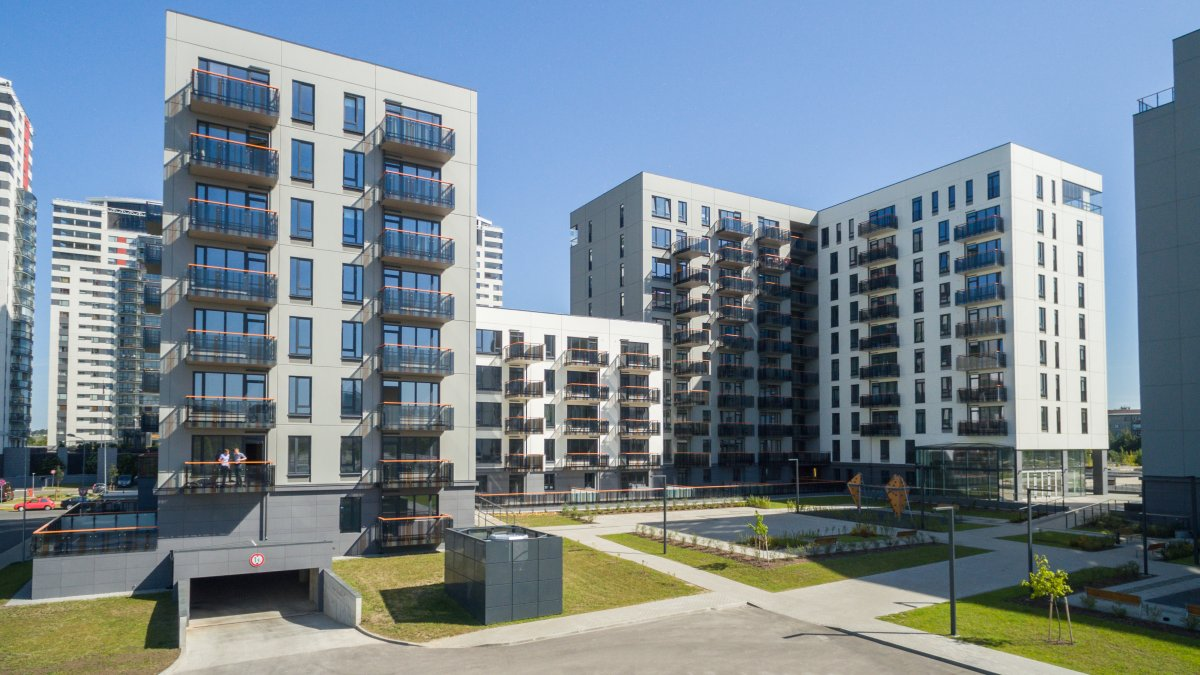
Skanstes mājas

Skanstes Parks

The construction of a residential complex was begun in 2015 in the Skanste neighborhood. The residential buildings are supplemented by a park and playground. The Skanstes Parks buildings have been completed and have been operational since 2017.

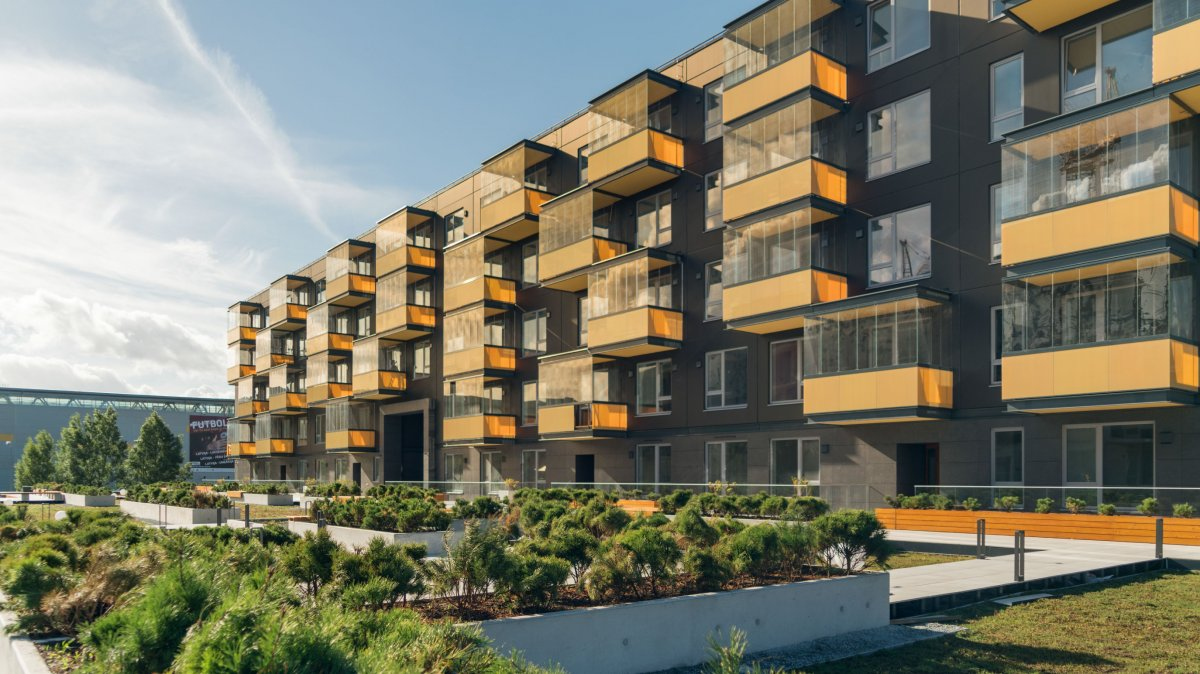
Skanstes parks

LNK Centre

The eight-storey office building of LNK (Latvijas Novitātes Komplekss – Latvian Innovation Complex) opened for business in 2006. Originally built and used by Latvijas Krājbanka, in 2014 it became the main offices of LNK Centre. Design: Sarma & Norde. Construction general contractor: Merks.

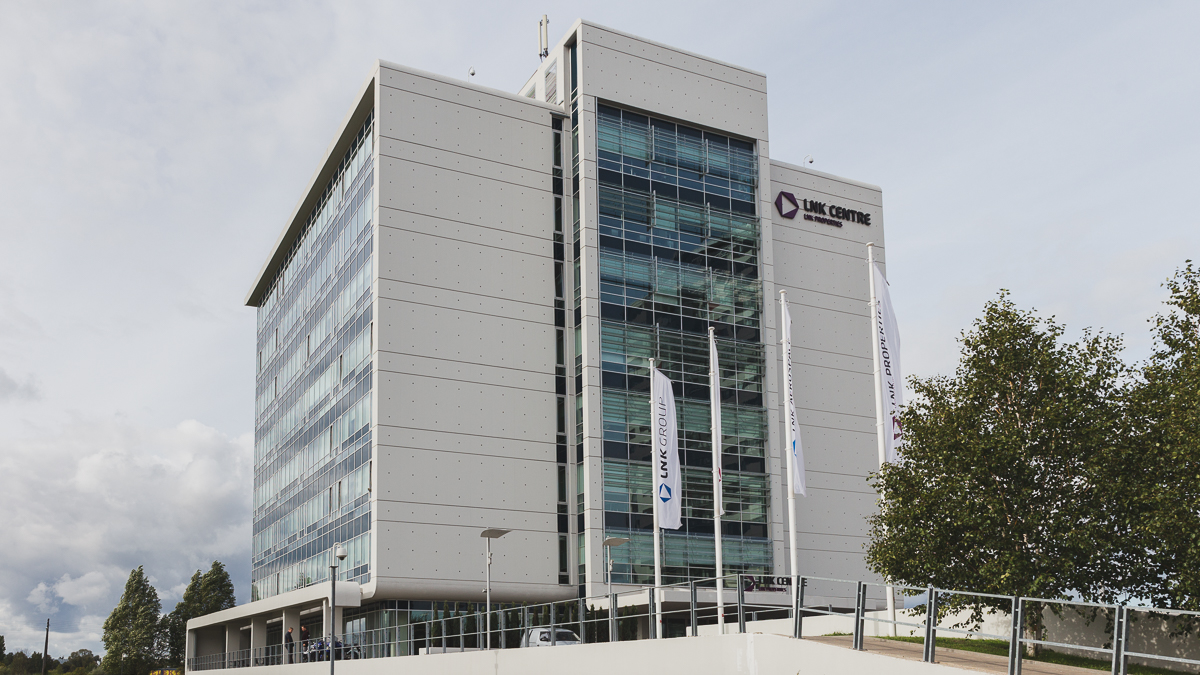
LNK Centre

SWH Office Center

It is the first office center developed in Skanste and remains one of the largest class-B office centers in Riga: Skanstes iela 50, 50a, 50b, 50c, 52, 52a, 54, and 54a. The center consists of 8 buildings with about 50 businesses. In 2019, it is planned to finish refurbishing the three oldest buildings into class B-1 office space. After renovation, the space for rent will reach about 40,000 m^{2} (430,000 sq ft).

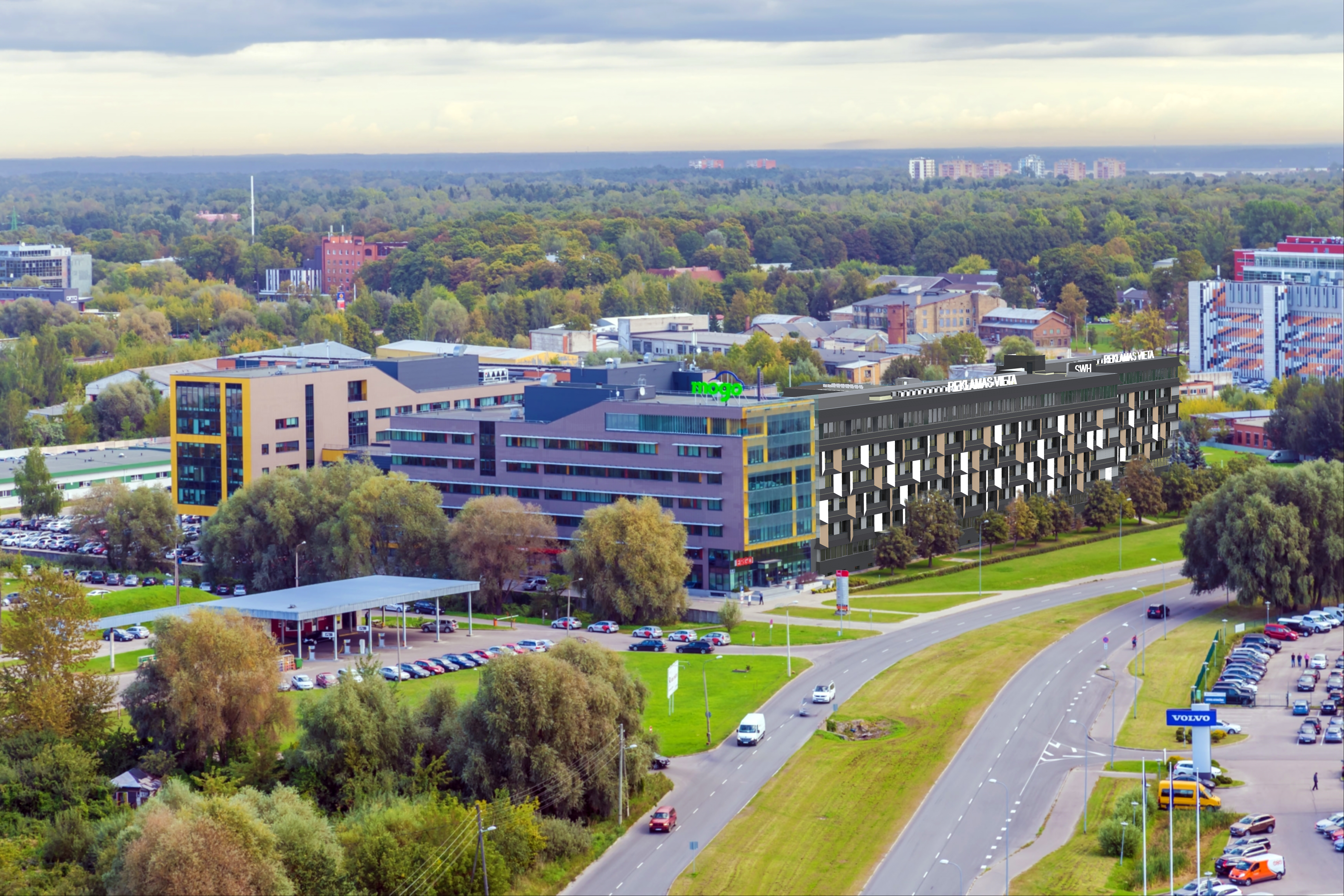
SWH Office Center

=== Place Eleven ===
The 14-storey office building was put into operation at the end of 2016. The total floor space of the building is 24,000 m^{2} (260,000 sq ft), with 14,500 m^{2} (156,000 sq ft) available for rent. Place Eleven is one of the largest office complexes in Riga and the first office building whose design was awarded the BREEAM Certificate of Excellence.

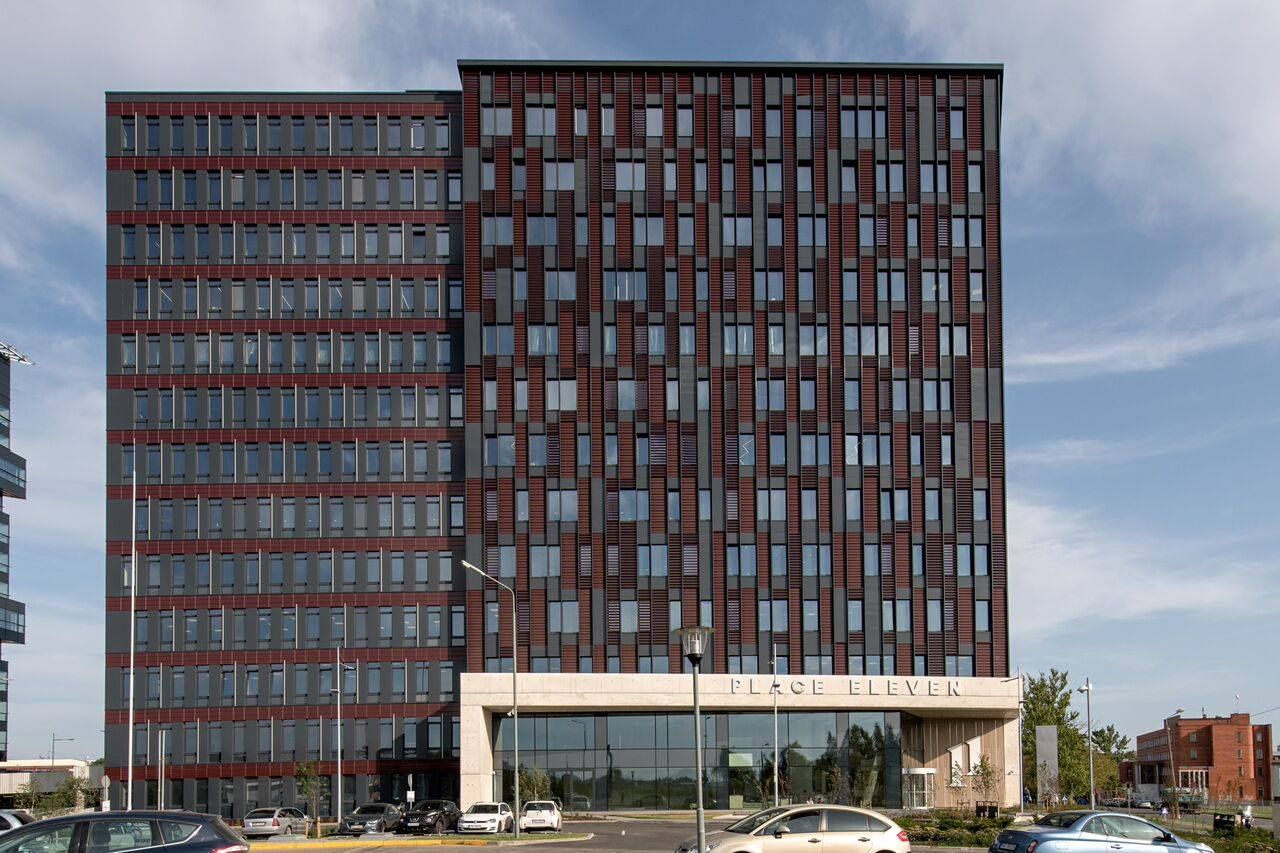
PLACE ELEVEN

The design placed first in The Most Sustainable Project in Latvia 2015. It is developed by HANNER Group.

== Skanste in the future ==
=== Residential building projects ===
By now, three residential complexes have been completed: Skanstes virsotnes, Skanstes mājas, and Skanstes Parks. With the area developing, a number of apartments will be built in Skanste.

KBO residential complex

The real estate developer KBO began activities in Latvia in 2014, representing the real estate projects of the Finnish corporation Insinōōritoimisto Bertel Ekengren Oy. In 2019, it is planned to begin construction of a residential quarter in Skanste.

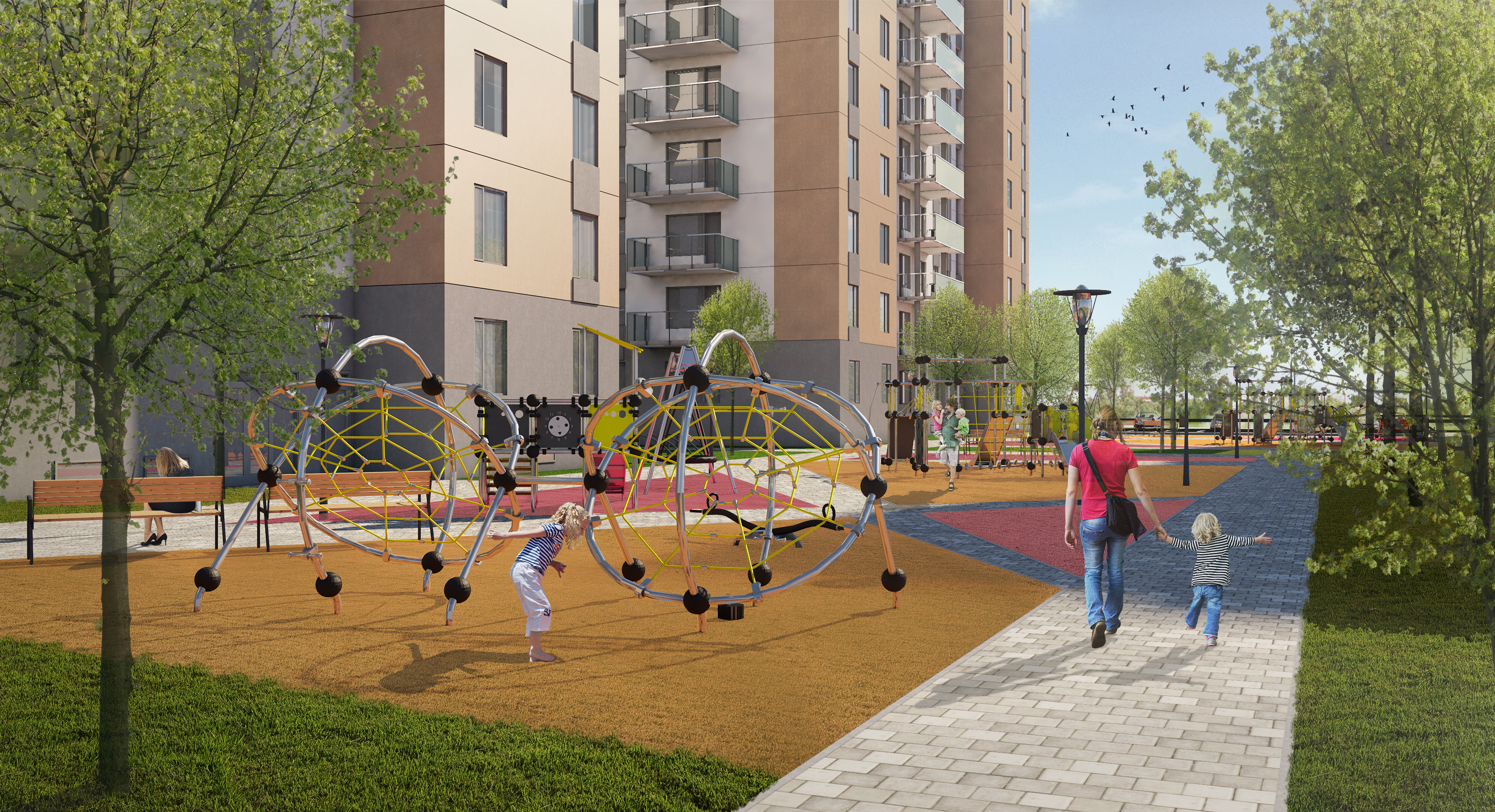
KBO residential complex

In the first stage, three nine-storey residential buildings will be constructed, with a total of 306 apartments. The total floor area of the buildings will be 25,893 m^{2} (278,710 sq ft). The outside territory of the buildings will include playgrounds, parking and bicycle stands.

The complete project will include 15 residential buildings with 1200 apartments for 4000 residents.

=== Development of Riga’s business and trade centers ===
ELEMENTAL Skanste

This business center will include class-A office buildings, drafted at BIM and, in compliance with BREEAM standards, are energy efficient. The complex consists of five office buildings with a total floor area of about 55,000 m^{2} (590,000 sq ft). The complex will be able to accommodate 2000 cars: 1100 in the multi-level parking garage and 900 underground.

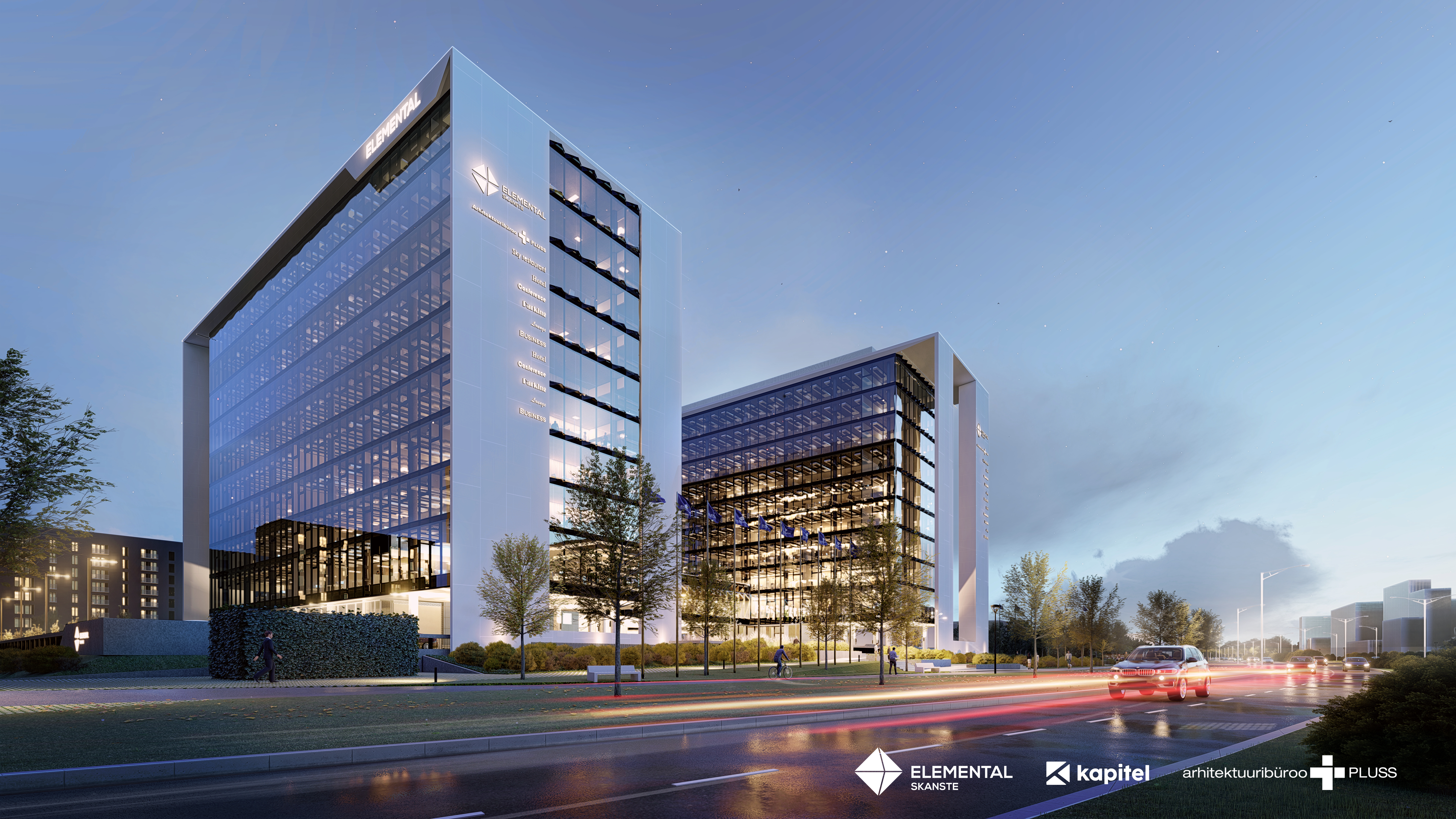
Elemental Skanste

The first stage of development involves building a twin-tower 11-storey office building with a total floor area of 28,000 m^{2} (300,000 sq ft) and parking for 440 cars. The first building is scheduled to be finished in 2020, the second in 2023, and the whole quarter by 2030.

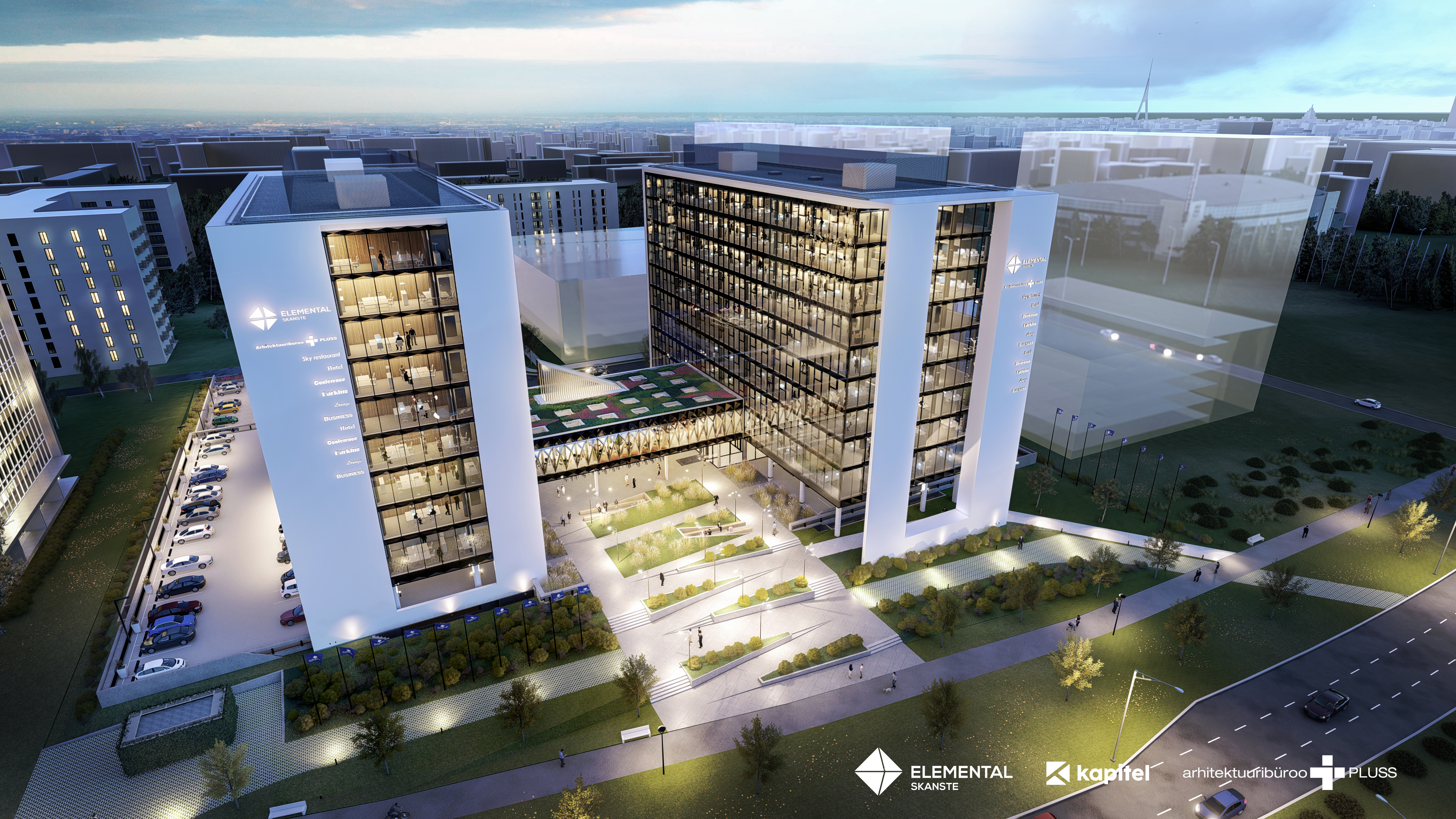
Elemental Skanste

Business center in the New Hanza territory

New Hanza is a business and residential area being developed in the Skanste neighborhood bordering on Pulkveža Brieža, Hanzas, Skanstes, and Sporta streets, where the former railway cargo terminal used to be. In the future a class-A office will be built here, as well as the multifunctional cultural center, Hanzas perons.

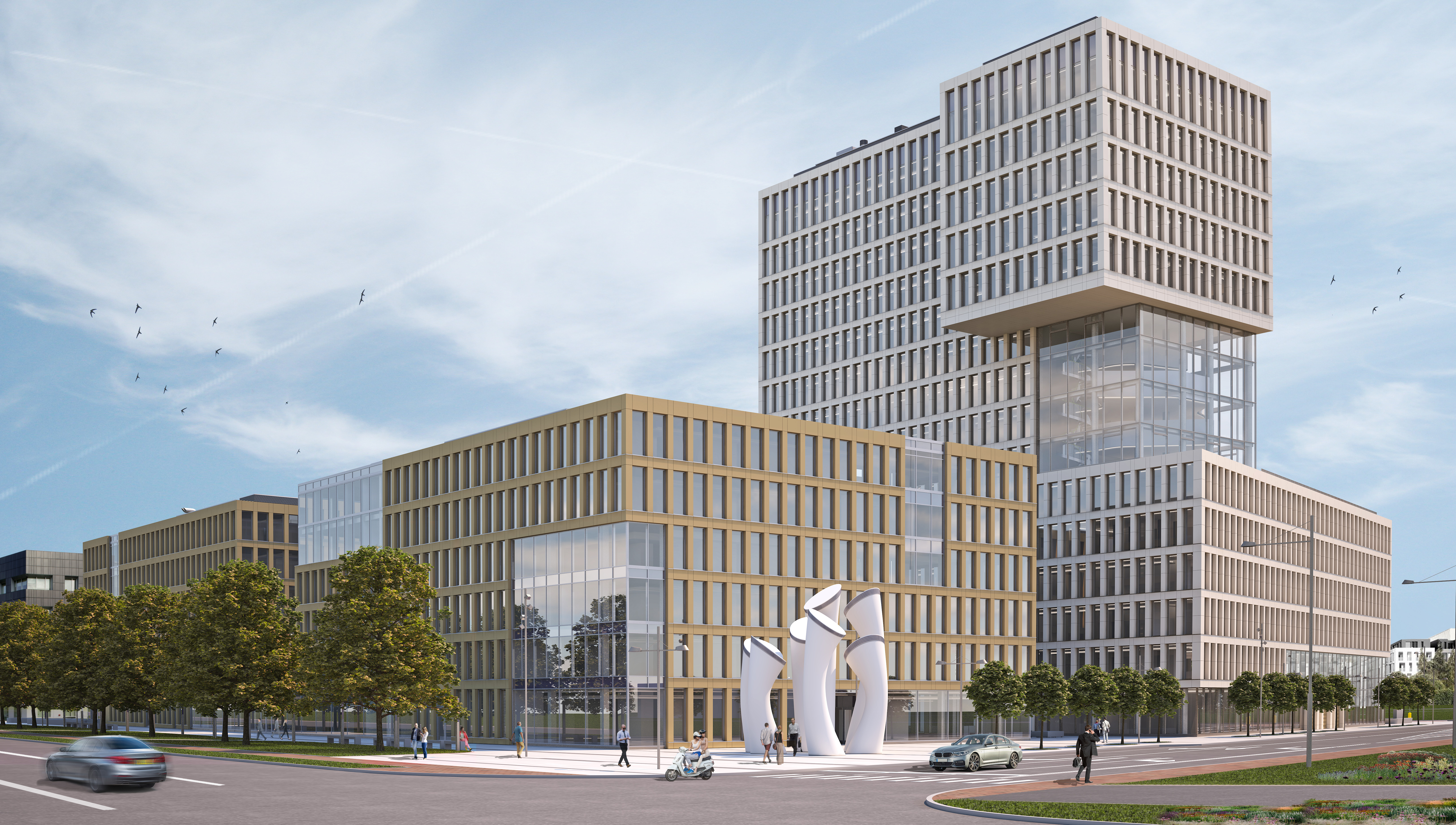
New Hanza Office Area

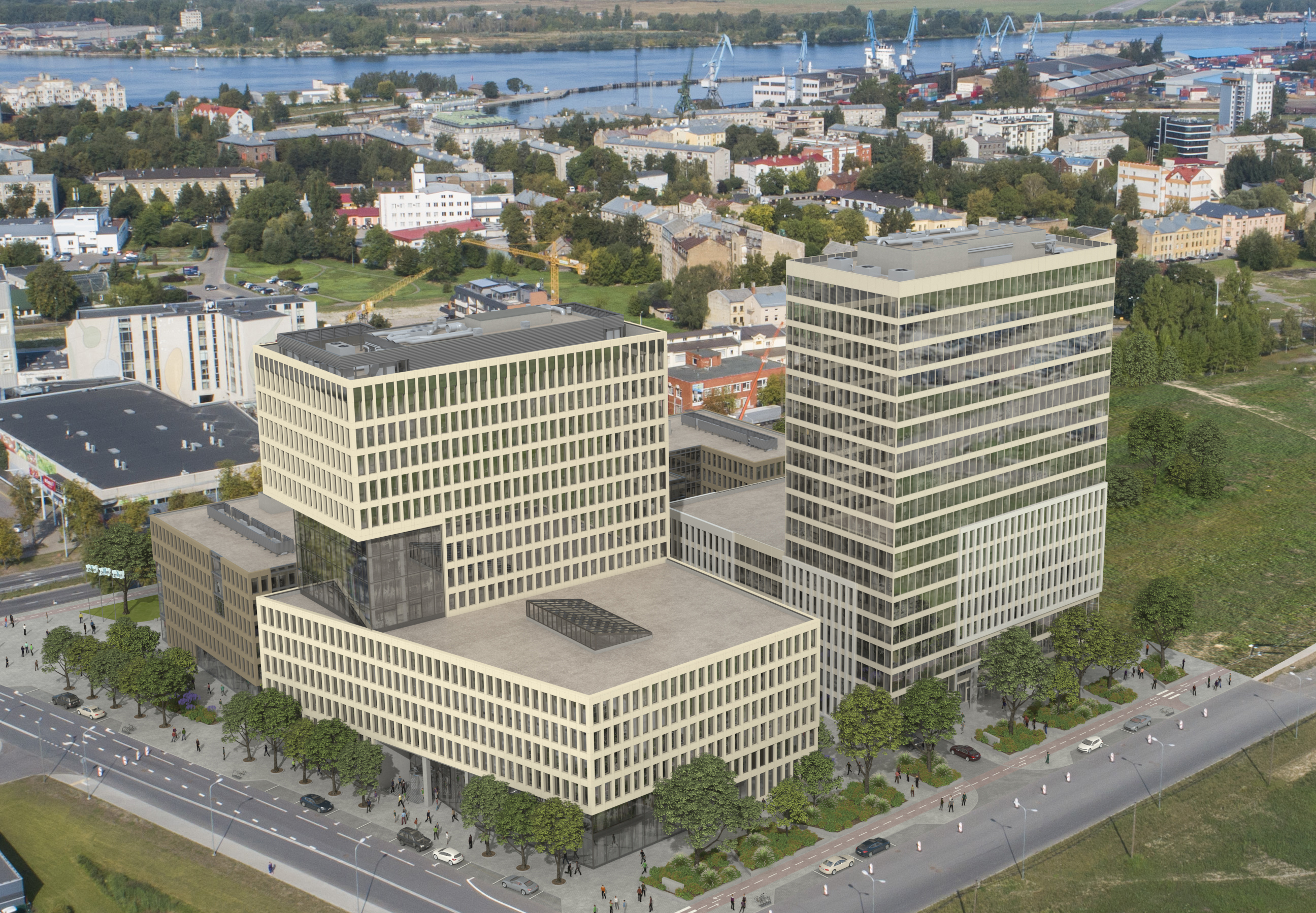
New Hanza office area

=== Latvian Museum of Contemporary Art ===
It is planned to build the Latvian Museum of Contemporary Art (LLMM) in the New Hanza territory. Construction will be based on the drawings of the winners of the international competition, the architectural bureau Adjaye Associates (United Kingdom) and AB3D (Latvia).

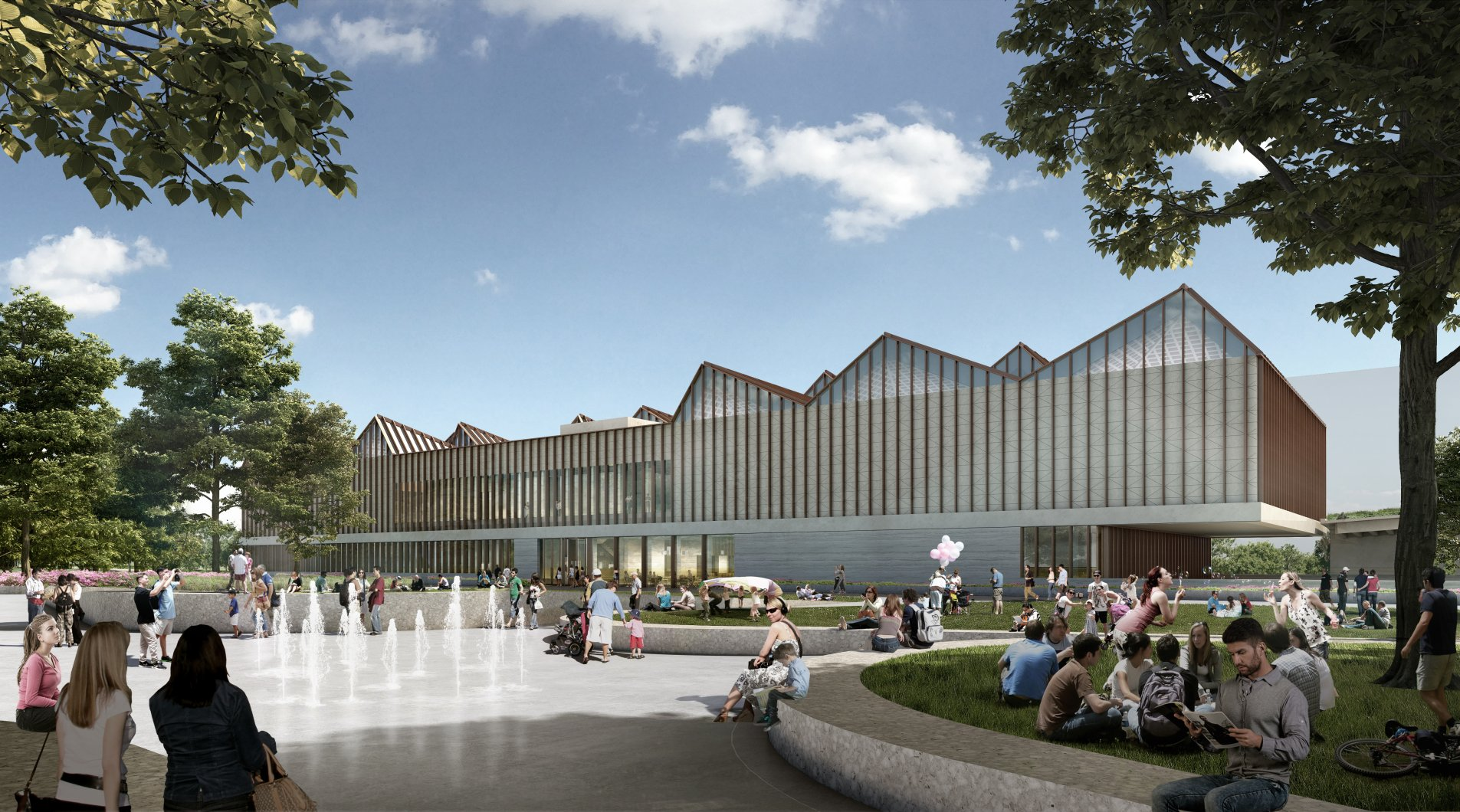
Latvian Museum of Contemporary Art

The Museum is conceived as a cultural and art center of interregional importance and the most visited art museum in the Baltics, whose exhibitions will regularly be included in the programs of museums of other countries.

Due to the liquidation of ABLV Bank, €186.7 million euro of investments of Pillar group's development projects were cancelled. Although initially the construction of LLMM was threatened, founders of the Latvian Museum of Contemporary Art Fund (LLMMF) Ināra and Boriss Teterevs, Ernests Bernis and Oļegs Fiļs decided to continue with the idea. Along with other financing, the Fund will have the opportunity to design and agree on the construction project with national and municipal institutions, preparing it for the beginning of construction. The development is currently in the last design stages, based on the Adjaye Associates and AB3D sketches.

The museum building is to take up almost 8,000 m^{2} (86,000 sq ft).

=== Riga conference and concert center ===
The construction of the Riga conference and concert center is scheduled to be completed by 2024. It is planned that the center will be able to attract around 600,000 visitors annually and will be situated next to the Luminor building. The project is to be financed within the framework of state and private partnership.

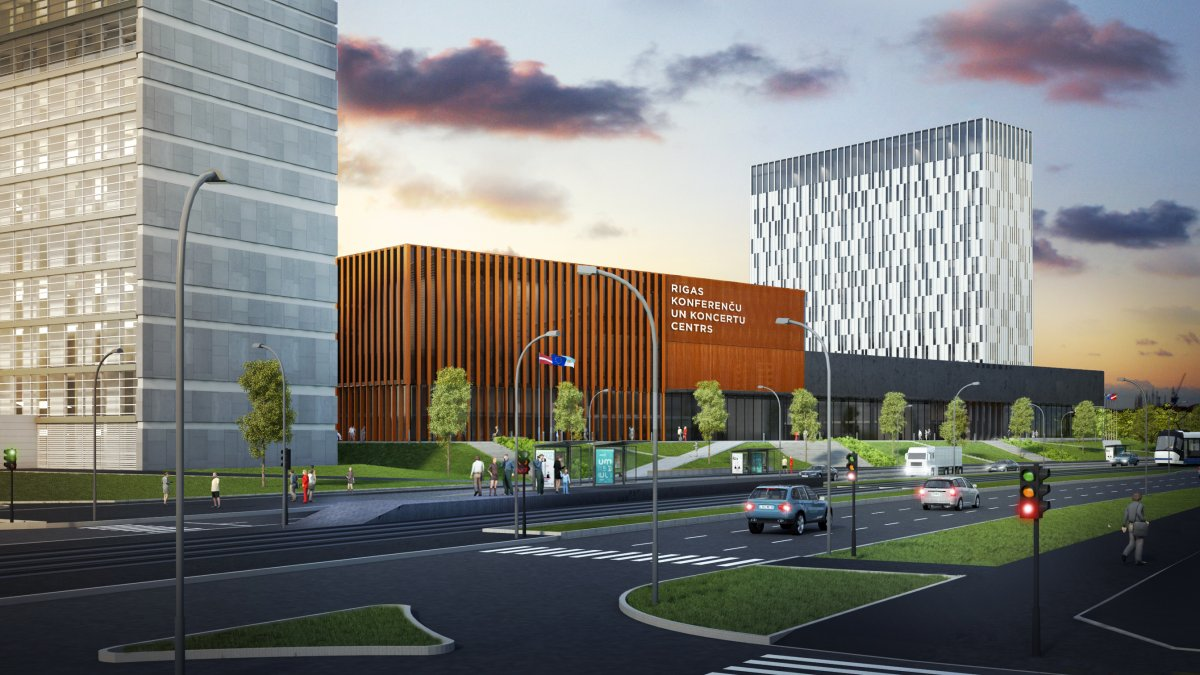
Riga conference and concert center

Taking as a model the Malmö Live project, the center will include three buildings: a music hall, a conference center, and a hotel. The conference center will also include a symphony hall, which will be the permanent home of the Latvian National Symphony Orchestra. The national level acoustic concert hall and conference center are stated priorities in strategic state and Riga City documents.

=== Sporta 2 quarter ===
The development of the quarter, which takes up more than 4 ha (9.9 acres) in the "quiet center", was begun in 2016 by NP Properties, developer of industrial parks. Now the territory between Hanzas, Vesetas, and Sporta streets is becoming a neighborhood for living, working, enjoying, creating, and forming various partnerships.

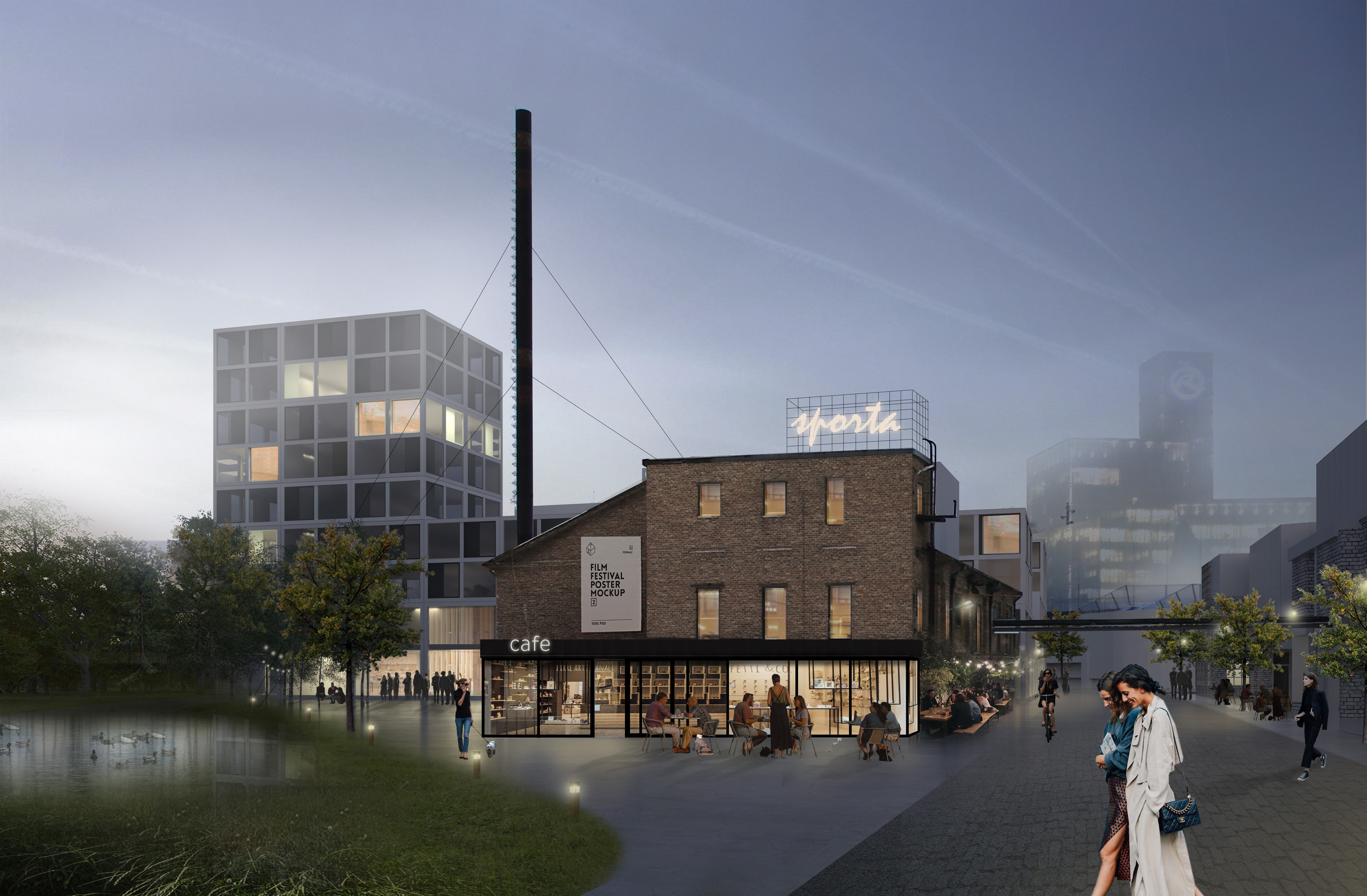
Sporta 2 quarter

The first permanent tenants – The Contemporary Art Center kim? and the business TechHub Riga, began their operations at Sporta 2 quarter in 2016, and now have been joined by several other creative institutions: FonFilms, the Royal Improvisation Theater, start-ups fashion enterprises, and others.

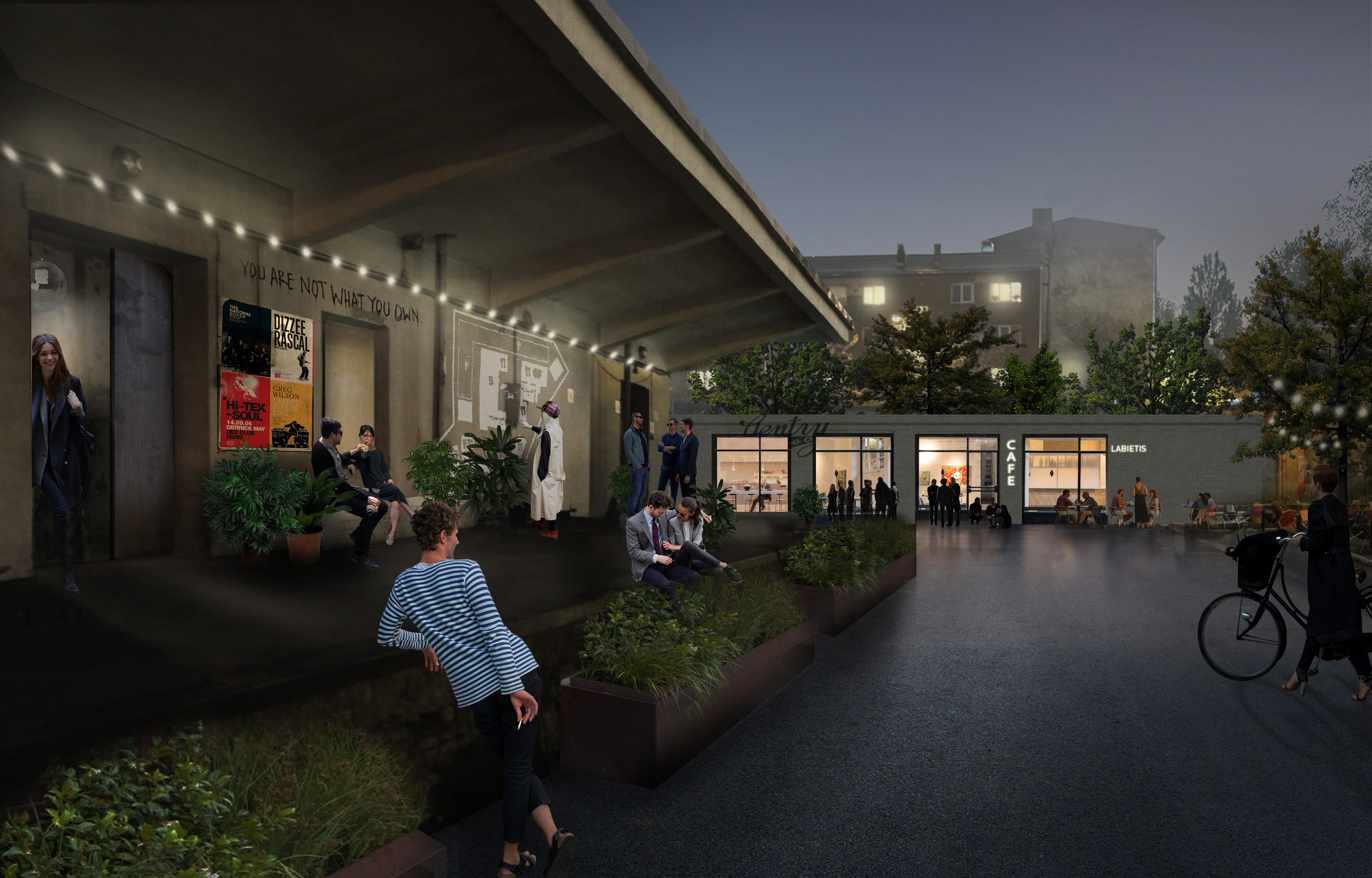
Sporta 2 quarter

At the beginning of 2019, reconstruction and improvement work will begin in the quarter to create an attractive environment in the center of the city with a combined space of almost 20,000 m^{2} (220,000 sq ft),

=== The Hanzas Perons multifunctional cultural center ===
The former warehouse of the cargo railway station is scheduled to be turned into a multifunctional cultural center, to use both as a concert venue, with a capacity of 1000, and as an art and exhibition gallery or venue for corporate events. This is the only historical building that will be preserved in the New Hanza territory. The reconstruction has been designed by the architectural bureau Sudraba arhitektūra.

The warehouse building is one of the few remaining structures that suggest the scale and infrastructure of the former cargo station. It has been preserved to this day with brick walls and wooden beams. Two glassed-in railway platforms will include a 1,230 m^{2} (13,200 sq ft) hall that will serve as the venue for various events. A section of the rails will also be renewed, complete with a dining car and engine.

=== METTA youth football education center ===
The center is designed to be situated in the Hanza stadium; the building will house stands with 1000 seats, a vast space for locker rooms, premises for exercising, physical therapy, medicine, dormitories, and administration, as well as a café. The function of the center will be to provide the space and state-of-the-art equipment necessary to raise high-level football players through both education and day-to-day supervision.

== Gallery of the projects ==
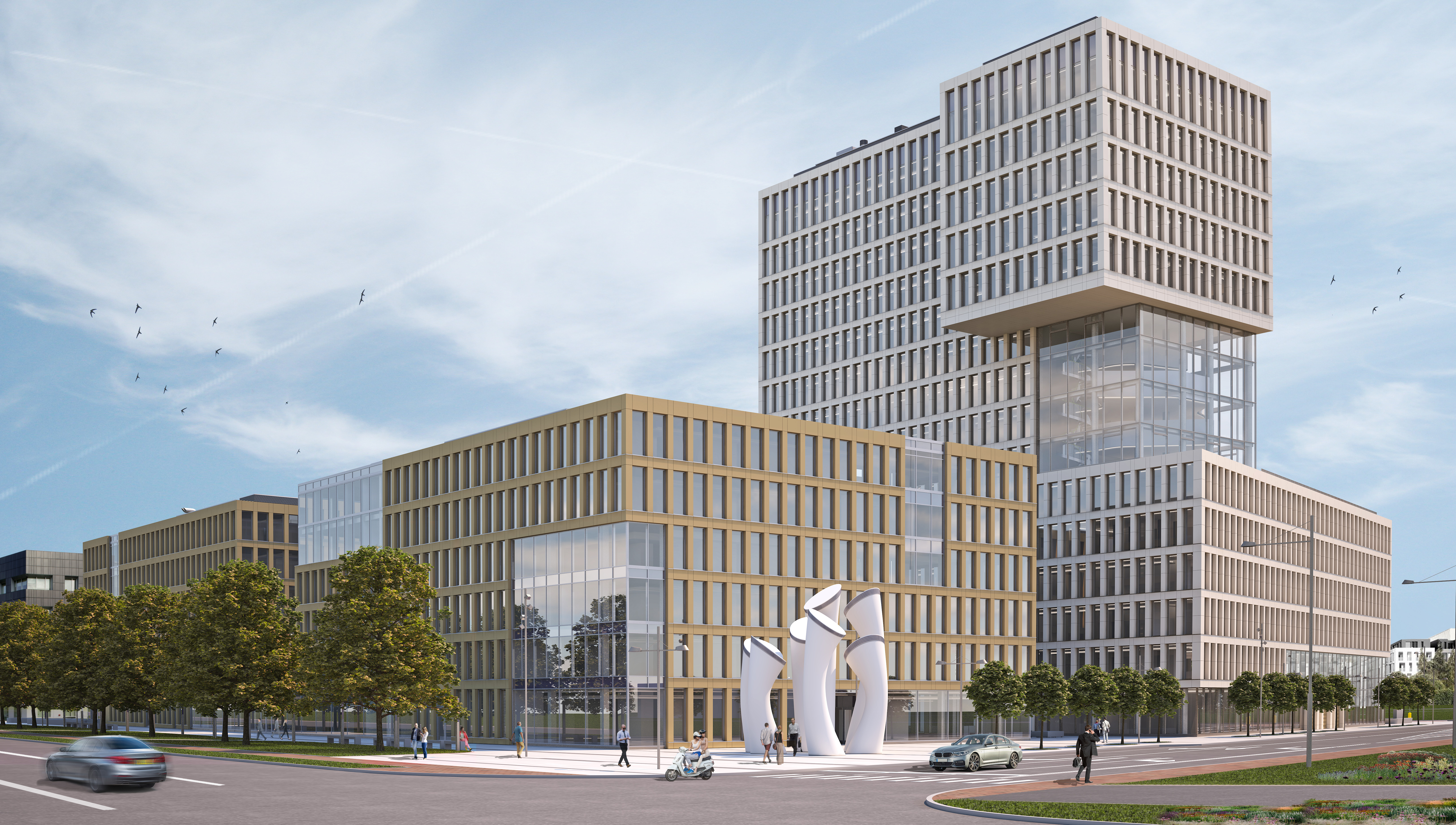
New Hanza office area

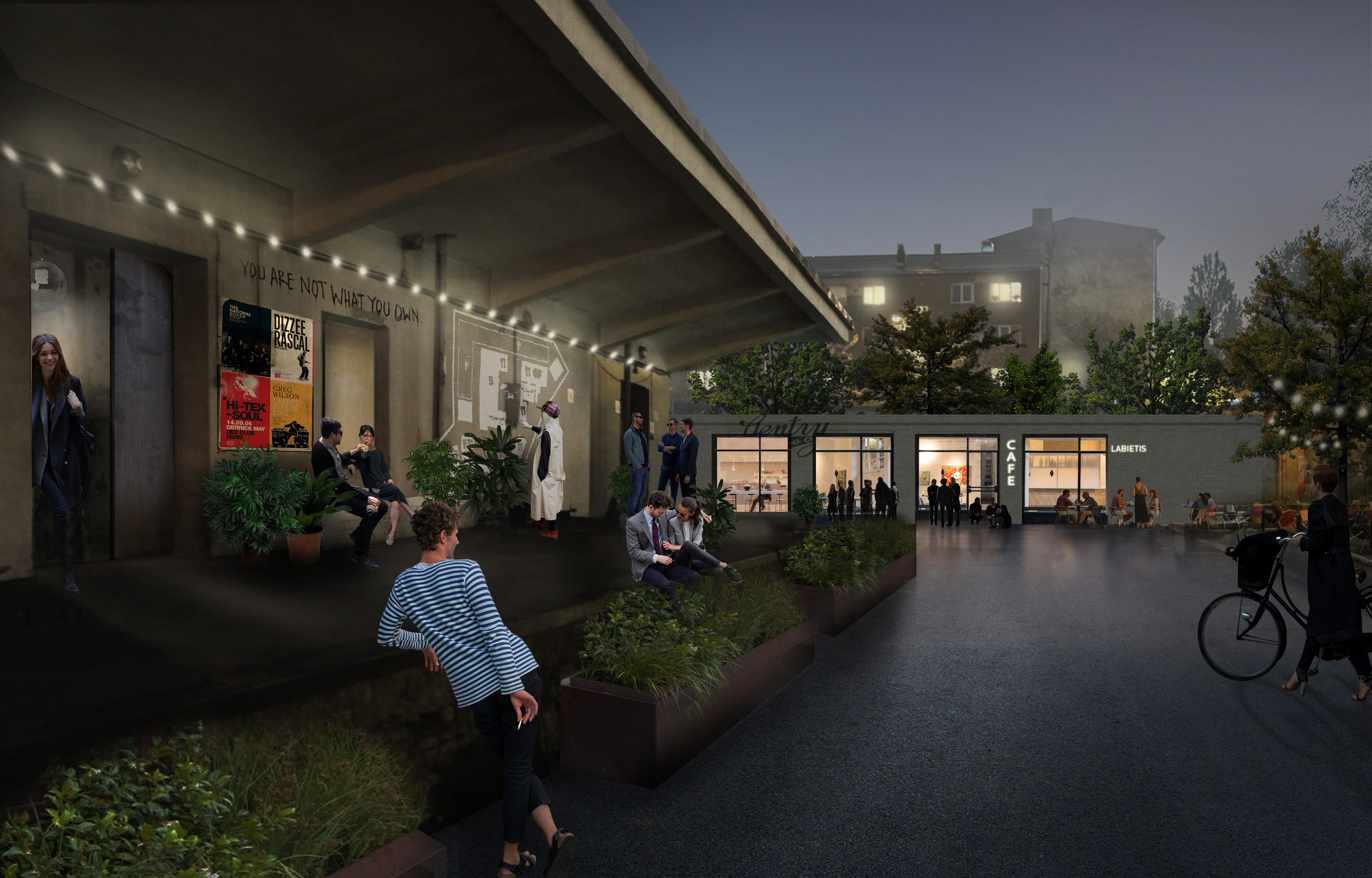
Sporta 2

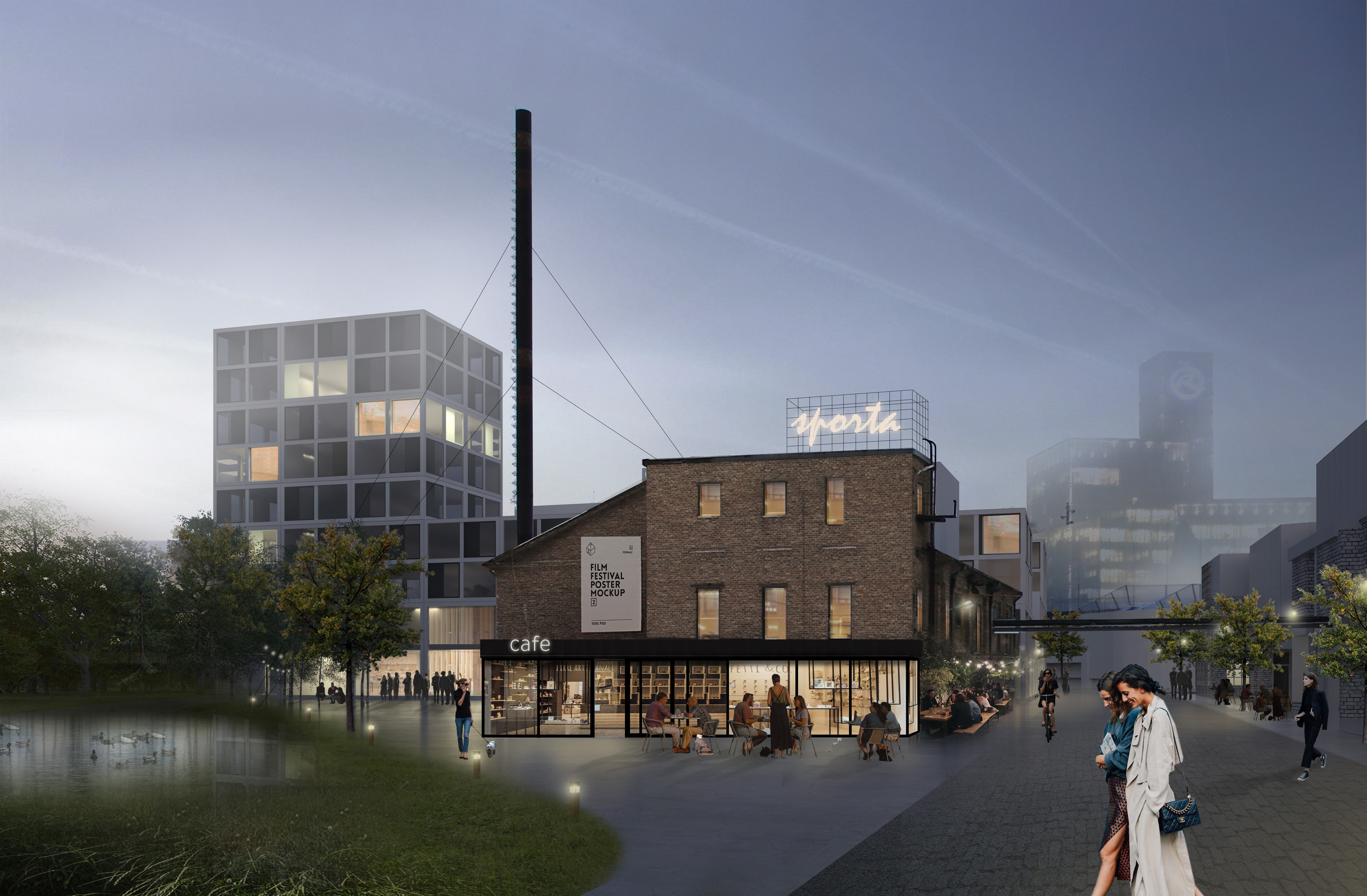
Sporta 2

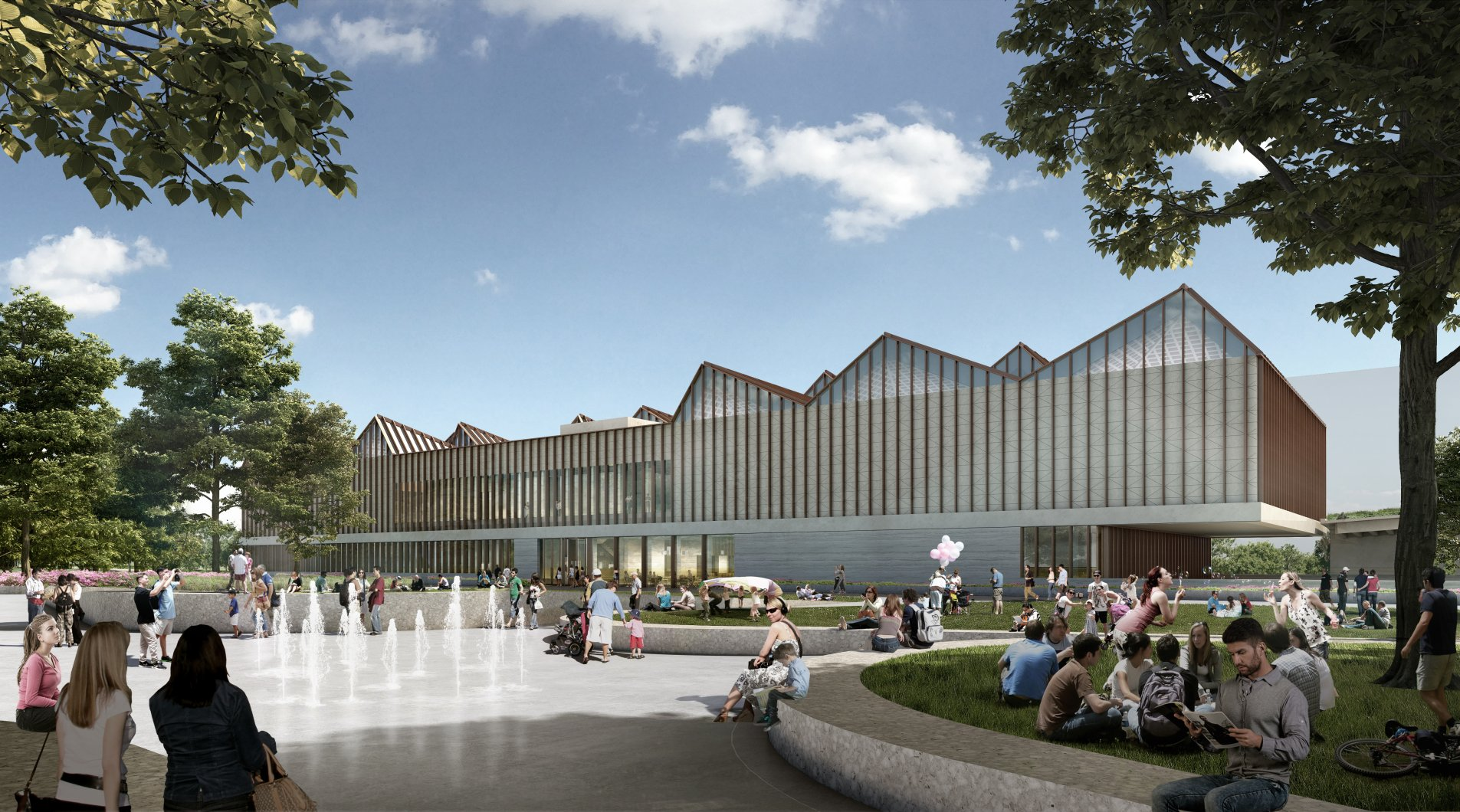
Latvian museum of Contemporary art (visualisation)

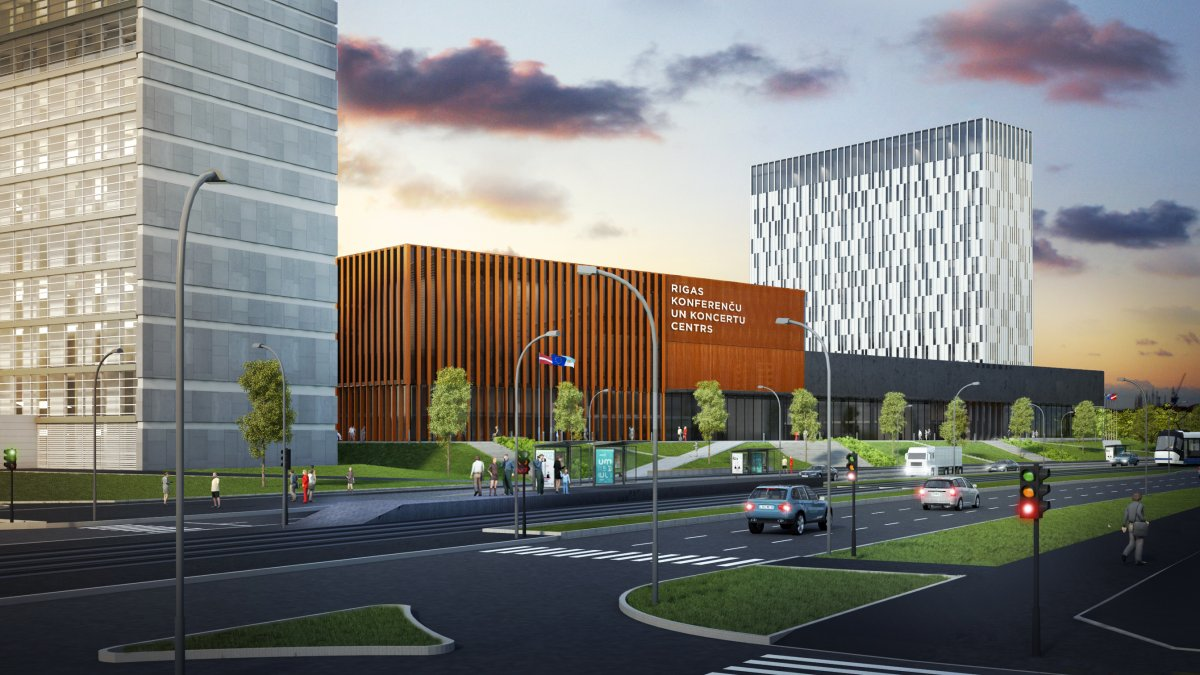
Riga conference and concert centre

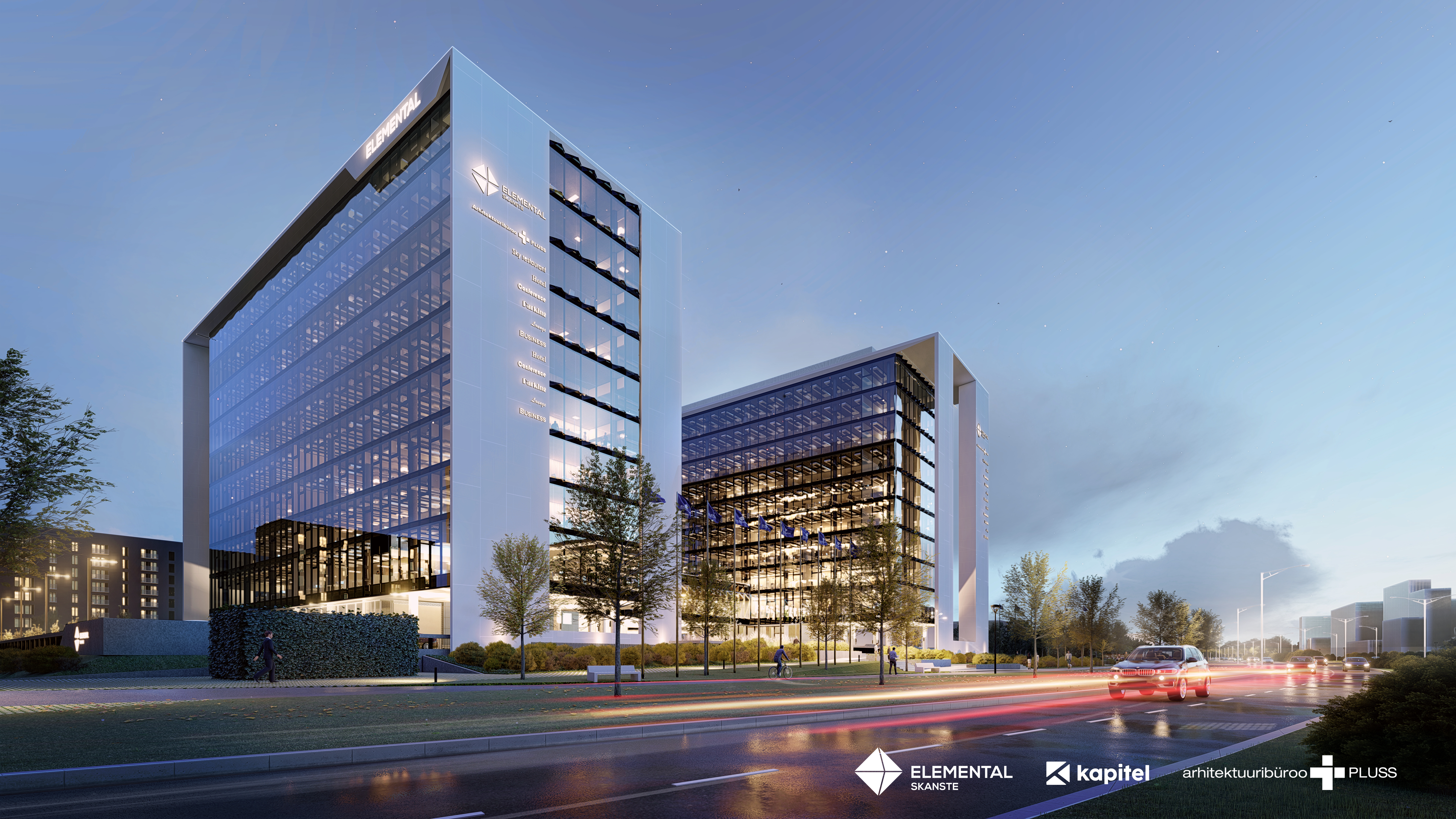
Elemental Skanste

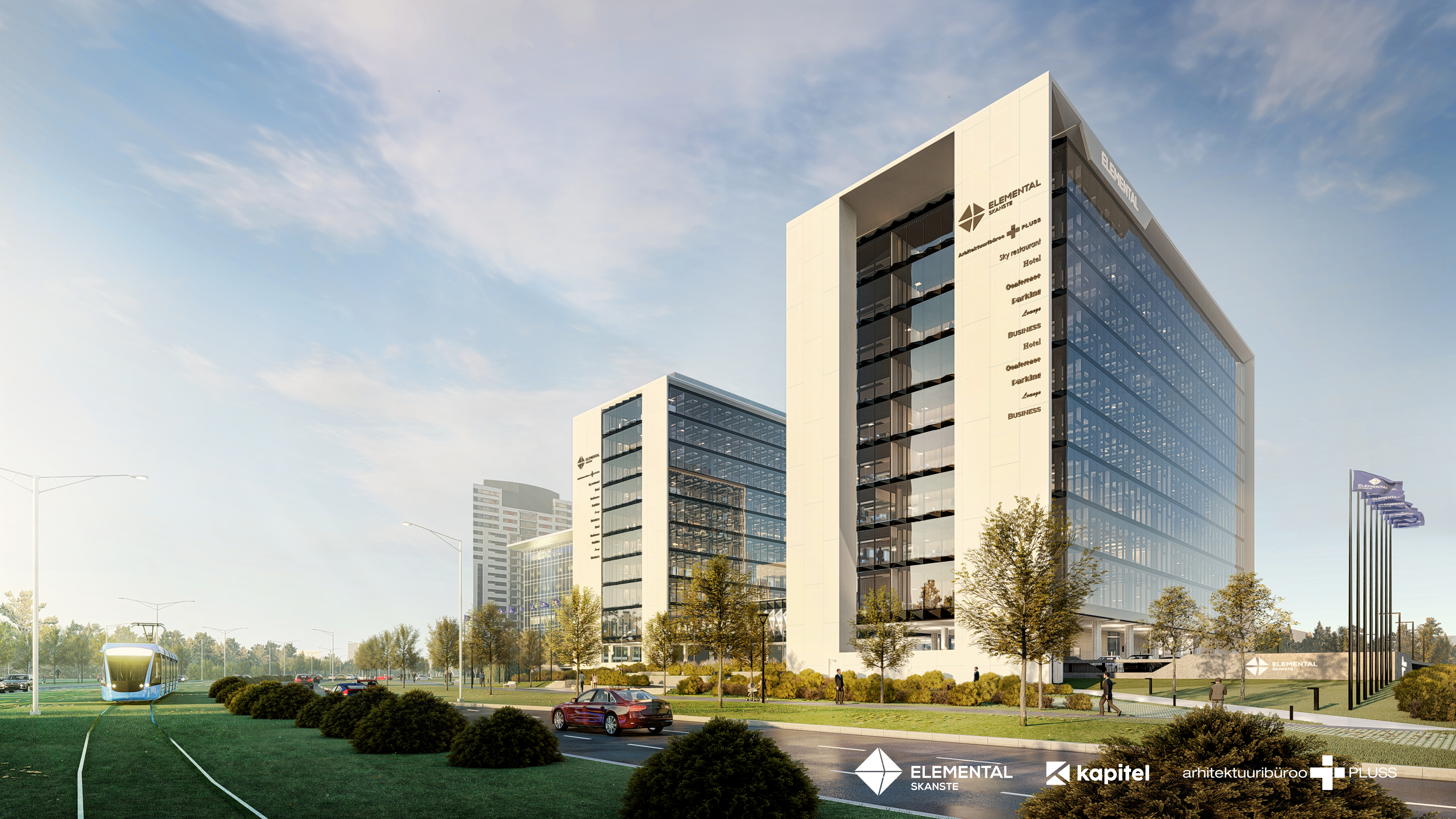
Elemental Skanste

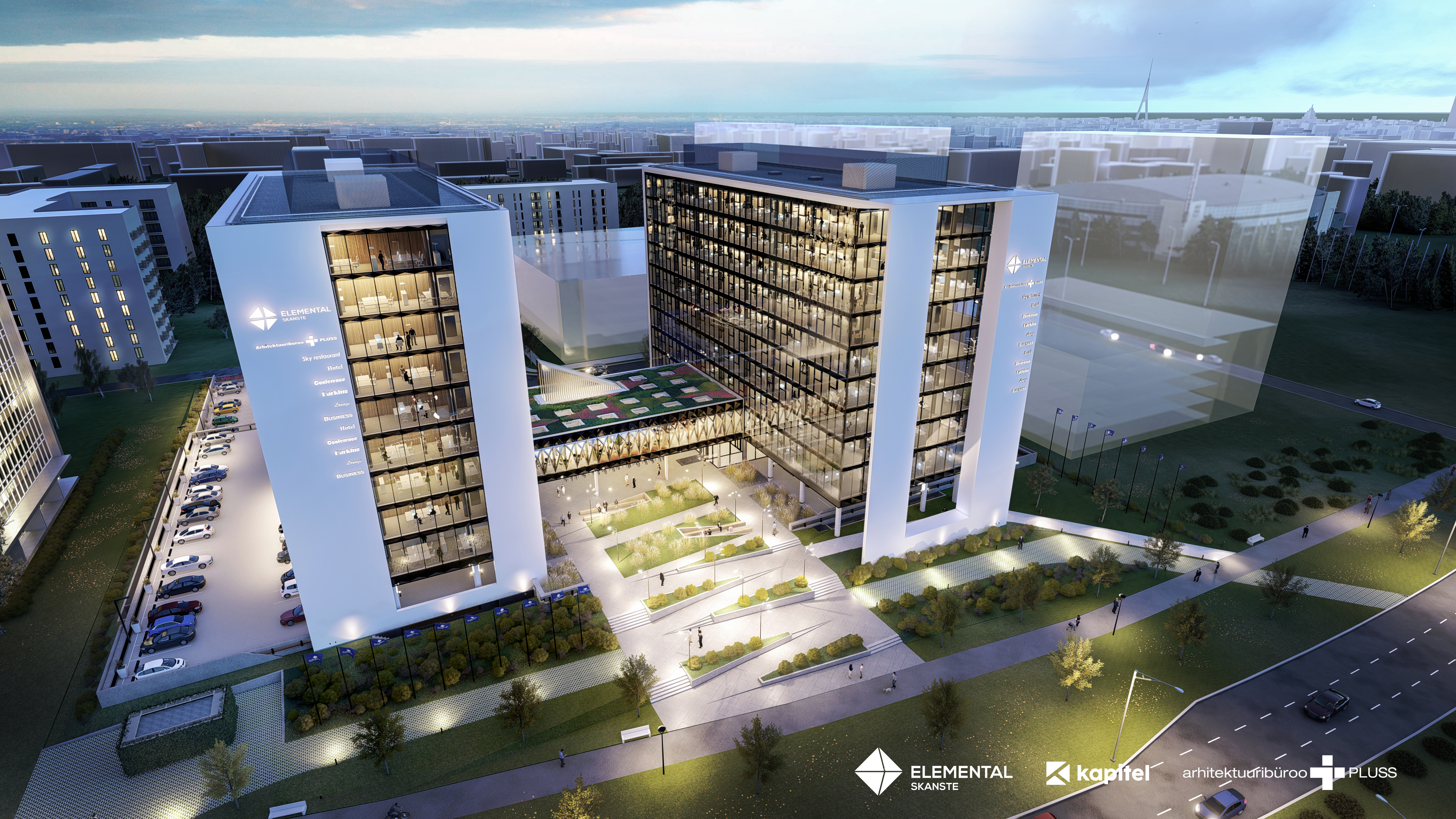
Elemental Skanste

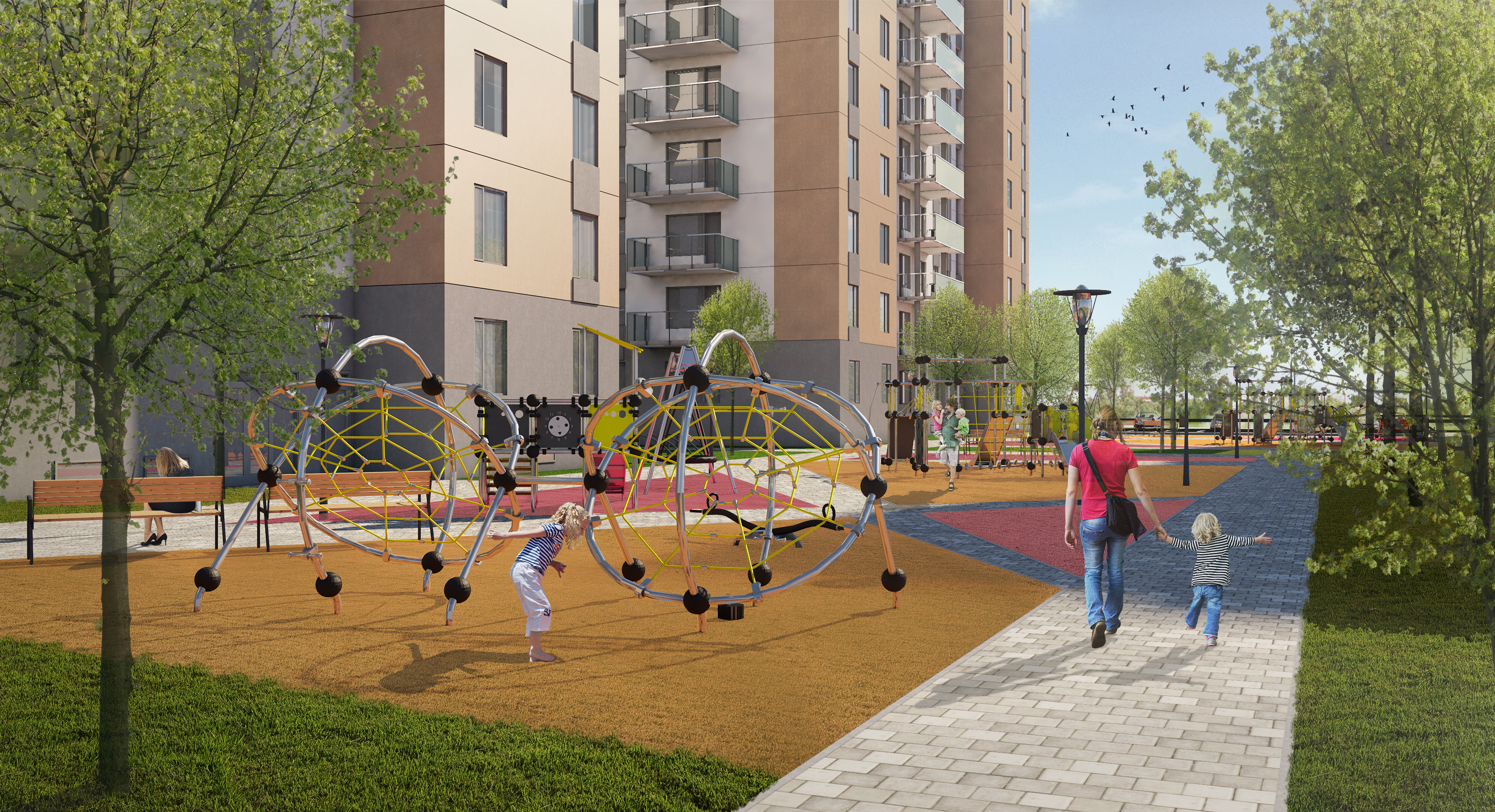
KBO residential housing

== Centers for international business services ==
International business service centers (IBSC) play a role in the economic growth of Central Europe and the Baltic region. Large international enterprises use IBSCs in cities with competitive business environments and available workforce to develop a wide range of business support functions: data processing, accounting, finances, logistics, human resources, and other services.

By 2024, several business centers are projected to be developed in Skanste, providing space both for many new and already functioning companies. Upon completion, the projected office floor space will be 100,000 m^{2} (1,100,000 sq ft), which will accommodate about 10,000 people.

Currently, around thirty companies in Latvia provide international business services, for instance, Tele2 Shared Service Center, Accenture, Circle K, Runway, Cabot, Tieto, ATEA, VISMA, Evry, and others. These companies account for about 7000 jobs in Riga, which involve only about 1% of the capital's population (a total of about 700,000).

Compared to two Polish cities of an equal size, the situation is as follows: in Kraków (population of about 760,000) international business services are provided by 6.6% of the population and in Wrocław (population of a little more than 630,000) by 5.4%. In absolute terms, it amounts to 50,300 people in Kraków and 34,000 in Wrocław, compared to Riga's 7,000.

On April 26, 2018, a memorandum of cooperation on the development of international business service centers in Riga was signed under solemn ceremony at the Place Eleven business center. This memorandum provides for a purposeful collaboration between state institutions, the city and private sector in developing the IBSC sector and providing new jobs. The memorandum was signed by the Minister of Economy Arvils Ašeradens, Chairman of the Riga City Council Nils Ušakovs, Director of the Latvian Investment and Development Agency Andris Ozols, on the part of the public sector and the Chairman of the Board of the National Alliance of Real Estate Developers Mārtiņš Vanags, Chairperson of the Board of the Association of Latvian Commercial Banks Sanda Liepiņa, and the Chairperson of the Foreign Investors Council Zlata Elksniņa-Zaščirinska on the part of the private sector.

== Infrastructure ==
=== Education ===
In Skanste or nearby all levels of educational establishments are located. These include four kindergartens.

- BA School of Banking and Finance

Eduniversal has rated BA School of Banking in Finance among the world's 1000 best business schools. It provides students with a solid theoretical base and offers internships both in Latvia and abroad. After graduating, students not only have a degree but also professional qualifications. The school offers basic, bachelor and master's level study programs, as well as the inter-college Ph.D. program in business management.

- Riga Hanzas High School

Hanzas High School is the first in Riga not to have a number in its name. It was established in 1993, offering both elementary level and general secondary education in different tracks. There are also possibilities to pursue extracurricular activities in culture and sports. In 2000 an addition was built to the school, housing different types of gyms. The school also has its own football field.

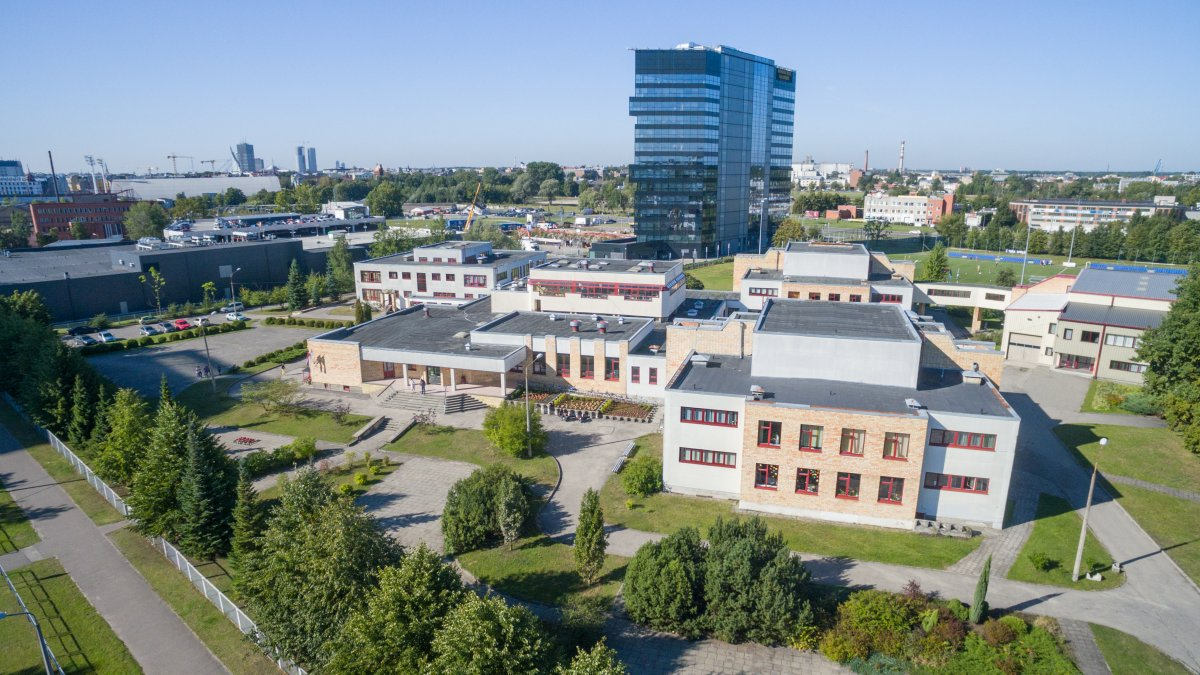
Riga Hanzas High School

- Riga Kindergarten No. 49

It provides the general pre-school education program and accepts children from the age of one-and-a-half. The language of instruction is Latvian.

- Riga Kindergarten No. 59

It provides the general pre-school education program and accepts children from the age of 3, as well as the general pre-school program for minorities, accepting children from the age of one-and-a-half. The languages of instruction are Latvian and Russian.

- Riga Kindergarten No. 66

It provides the general pre-school education program for minorities, accepting children from the age of one-and-a-half. The language of instruction is Russian.

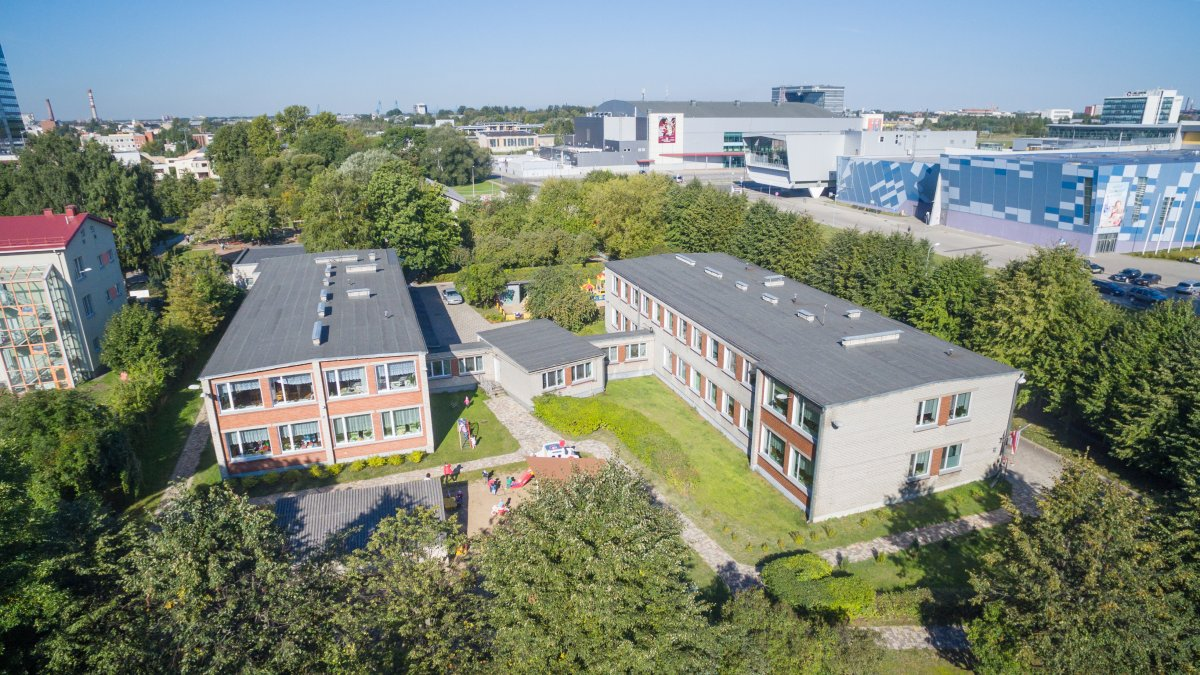
Riga Kindergarten No. 66

- Riga Kindergarten No. 213

It provides the general pre-school education program and accepts children from the age of one-and-a-half. The language of instruction is Latvian.

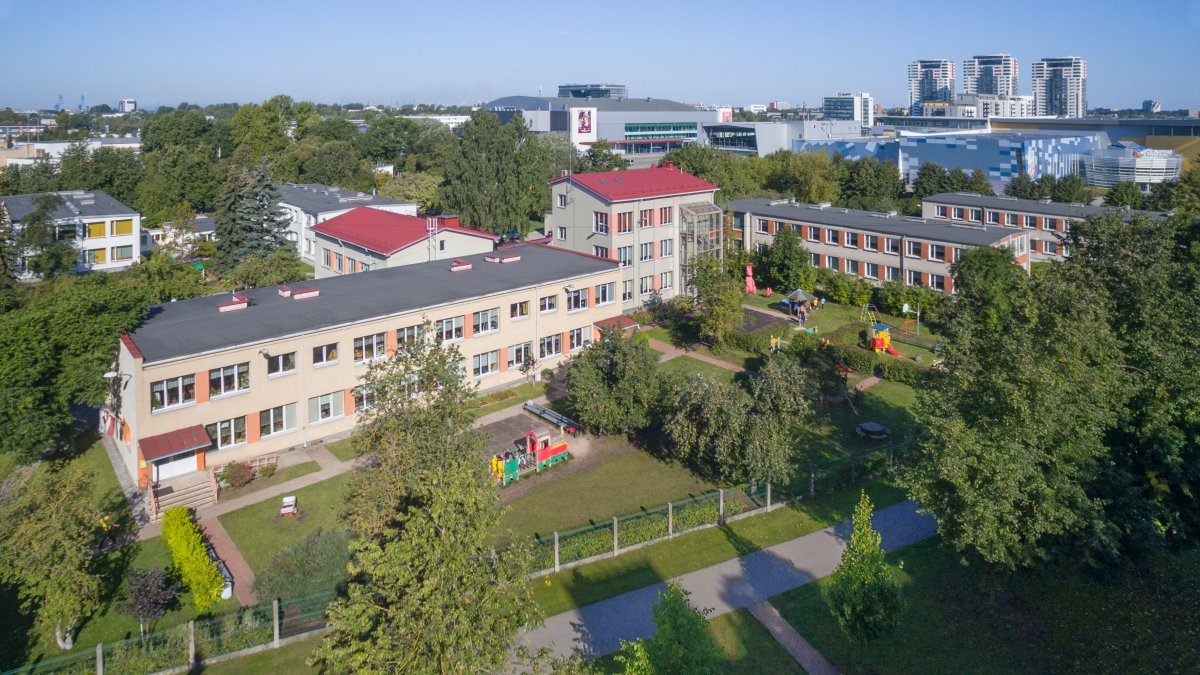
Riga Kindergarten No. 213

=== Healthcare ===
- Emergency medical services

The Riga Regional Emergency Medical Services Center is located right next to the Skanste neighborhood and provides emergency services 24/7. It is located at Duntes iela 8.

- ORTO Clinic

The only private Baltic center specializing in the treatment of back, shoulder, elbow, knee, foot and foot joint problems, as well as rheumatological diseases, and providing physical therapy and rehabilitation. The clinic is located at Bukultu iela 1a.

- Traumatology and Orthopedics Hospital

The hospital offers a round-the-clock emergency medical care for trauma to or disease of muscles and bones. 24/7 emergency services are provided by surgeons, anaesthesiologists, intensive care and other specialists. The hospital is located at Duntes iela 22.

- Dermatology Clinic of Health Center 4

The largest Latvian clinic of this type, providing a variety of consultations and services by doctors and specialists. It is located at Skanstes iela 50, 3rd floor.

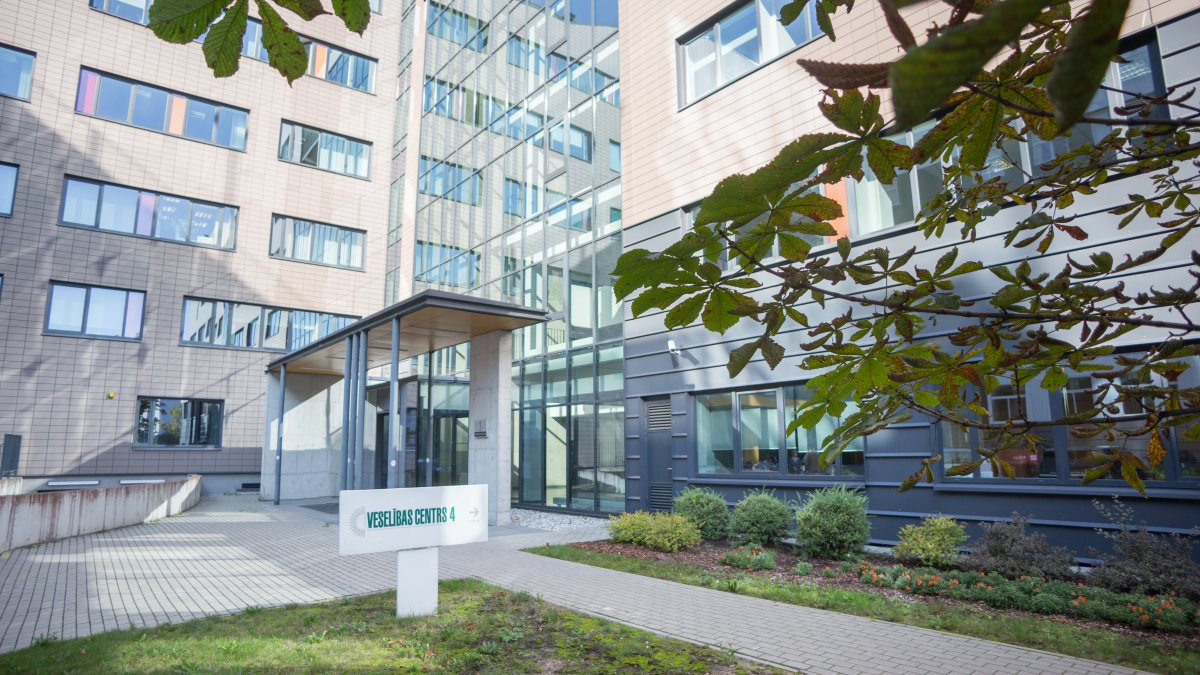
Dermatology Clinic of Health Center 4

=== Transport ===
Availability of public transportation

Several public transportation routes lead through or to the Skanste neighborhood. Trams No. 5 and 9 go on Ganību dambis; trolley-bus No. 3 goes toward Sarkandaugava. Buses No. 2, 11, 24, and 49 have their stops in the neighborhood. In the future, there are projected improvements in the infrastructure, by setting up a new tramline, which will connect Skanste to the Main Railway Station in Riga, a planned stop on the new Rail Baltica line.

Availability of bicycle paths

The bicycle path Center–Mežaparks was unveiled in 2007. It begins at the intersection of Skanstes and Hanzas streets, running along Skanstes and then Gaujas street, crossing the railroad by Brasa station and then along Ķīšezers street and Koknese prospekts, leading to Meža prospekts. The total length of the path is 6.6 kilometres (4.1 mi) and allows one to reach Mežaparks from the center in 25 minutes. The bicycle path now has a 5-kilometre-long (3.1 mi) extension from Mežaparks to Vecmīlgrāvis. A further extension to Vecāķi is planned.

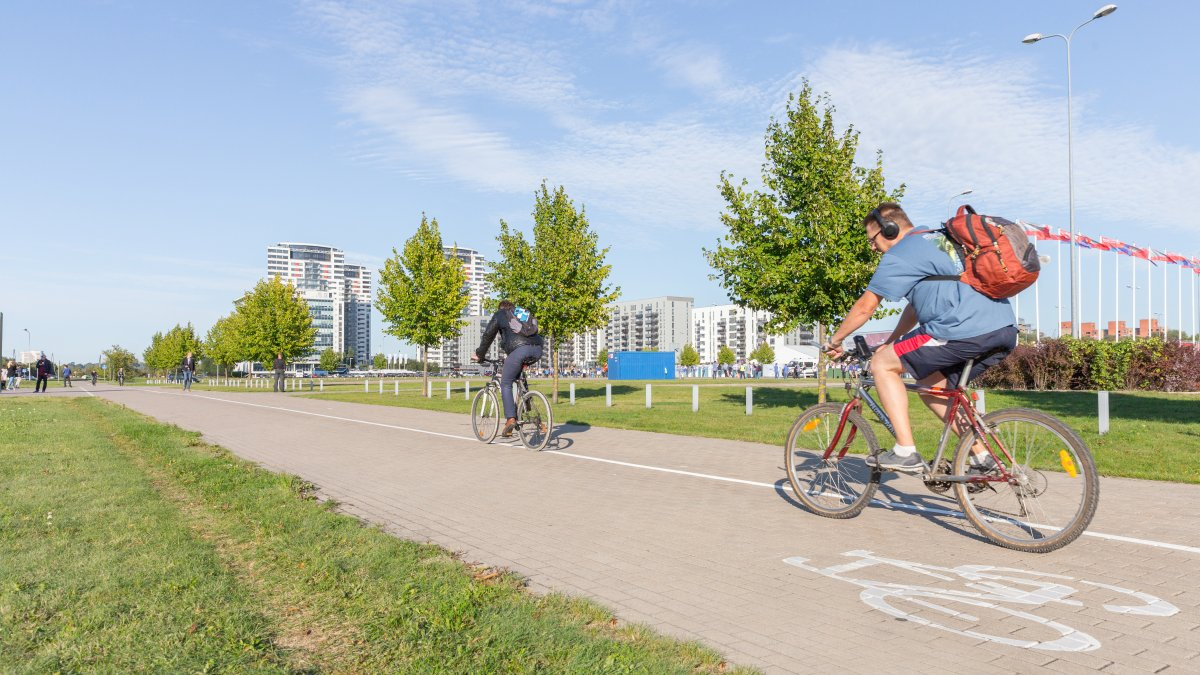
Skanste bicycle path Centre - Mežapar

== See also ==
- Vilnius CBD, Lithuania
- Rotermanni Quarter, Estonia
