= BREEAM =

Assessment of building sustainability

Logo

The Building Research Establishment Environmental Assessment Method (BREEAM), first published by the Building Research Establishment (BRE) in 1990, is widely recognised as the world's longest established method of identifying the sustainability performance of buildings. Around 600,000 buildings have been BREEAM-certified. Additionally, 2.3 million buildings have registered for certification globally. BREEAM also has schemes for infrastructure and masterplanning.

== Purpose ==
BREEAM is an assessment undertaken by independent licensed assessors using scientifically-based sustainability metrics. It takes an holistic approach, with categories evaluating management, water, energy, transport, health and wellbeing, resources, resilience, landuse and ecology, pollution, materials, waste and innovation. Buildings are rated and certified on a scale of "Pass", "Good", "Very Good", "Excellent" and "Outstanding".

BREEAM was created to help reduce the harmful impacts of building development on the environment.

== History ==
Work on the development of BREEAM began at the Building Research Establishment (based in Watford, England) in 1988, with the first version for assessing new office buildings launched in 1990. This was followed by versions for other building types including retail, industrial and existing offices.

In 1998, the BREEAM Offices standard underwent a major revision, introducing features such as the weighting of different sustainability issues. Further updates and additional building-type schemes were introduced in subsequent years.

In 2000, BRE launched EcoHomes, an environmental rating system for new and refurbished homes. EcoHomes later formed the basis of the Code for Sustainable Homes, developed by BRE for the UK Government in 2006–07, which replaced EcoHomes in England and Wales.

An extensive update of BREEAM schemes in 2008 introduced mandatory post-construction reviews, minimum standards and innovation credits, alongside the launch of international versions of BREEAM. That year also saw the introduction of BREEAM Communities, aimed at supporting the sustainable design of neighbourhood-scale developments.

In 2011, BREEAM New Construction was introduced, consolidating and reclassifying assessment criteria to streamline the certification process. Schemes for domestic refurbishment were published in 2012, followed by non-domestic refurbishment schemes in 2014, which were expanded internationally in 2015.

Following the winding down of the Code for Sustainable Homes in 2014, BRE launched the Home Quality Mark (HQM) in 2015 as a successor scheme for the assessment of new homes. HQM was intended to assess residential properties from the perspective of home performance and occupant experience.

In 2015, BRE acquired CEEQUAL a sustainability assessment scheme for civil engineering and infrastructure projects. CEEQUAL was subsequently rebranded as BREEAM Infrastructure in 2022.

BREEAM UK New Construction V6 was released on 24 August 2022 following the updates to building regulations in England, with V6.1 released on 14 June 2023 to reflect regulatory changes in Scotland, Wales and Northern Ireland.

In 2025, BRE launched BREEAM New Construction Version 7, alongside the integration of the Home Quality Mark into BREEAM UK New Construction Residential.

== Scope ==
BREEAM has expanded from its original focus on individual new buildings at the construction stage to encompass the whole life cycle of buildings from planning to in-use and refurbishment. Its regular revisions and updates are driven by the ongoing need to improve sustainability, respond to feedback from industry and to align with regulation and reporting requirements worldwide.

BREEAM schemes are tailored to different stages and types of development:

BREEAM New Construction and BREEAM UK New Construction Residential provide a framework to design and deliver high-performing sustainable buildings in the UK.

BREEAM International New Construction applies to buildings outside the UK (apart from countries with a national BREEAM scheme). Criteria can be adapted to local standards and priorities.

BREEAM In-Use assesses the performance of an existing building, including its physical elements, alongside its management and maintenance.

BREEAM Refurbishment and Fit Out is a scheme for refurbishment of commercial buildings, designed to improve performance, from the building envelope to interior fixtures and fittings.

BREEAM Communities supports sustainable masterplanning of whole communities. It is aimed at helping construction industry professionals to design places that people want to live and work in, are good for the environment and are economically successful.

BREEAM Infrastructure, formerly known as CEEQUAL (Civil Engineering Environmental Quality Assessment and Award Scheme), assesses the sustainability of civil engineering and infrastructure projects at every stage.

== National operators ==
BREEAM is used in more than 100 countries, with several in Europe having gone a stage further to develop country-specific BREEAM schemes operated by national scheme operators. There are currently operators affiliated to BREEAM in:

- Germany, Austria, Switzerland: TÜV SÜD operates BREEAM DE/AT/CH
- Netherlands: the Dutch Green Building Council operates BREEAM NL
- Norway: the Norwegian Green Building Council operates BREEAM NOR
- Spain: the Instituto Tecnológico de Galicia operates BREEAM ES
- Sweden: the Swedish Green Building Council operates BREEAM SE

Schemes developed by national scheme operators can take any format as long as they comply with a set of overarching requirements laid down in the Code for a Sustainable Built Environment. They can be produced from scratch by adapting current BREEAM schemes to the local context, or by developing existing local schemes.

== The cost and value of sustainability ==
A number of studies have examined the costs associated with sustainable building design compared with developments built only to meet minimum regulatory standards. Research by the Sweett Group on projects using BREEAM found that many sustainability measures added little or no additional capital cost. Where higher upfront costs were identified, these were sometimes offset by reduced operational expenses over the lifetime of the building.

The University of the Built Environment identifies a range of benefits of sustainability certification, including reduced environmental impact, increase in value, and savings in operation and maintenance costs.

Research indicates that sustainable buildings can offer improved value and quality. Meeting such standards typically involves detailed planning, design, specification and coordination between clients and project teams. These factors that can produce better building performance and improved conditions for building users.

There is evidence that buildings with a sustainability rating, such as BREEAM, provide increased rates of return for investors, and higher rental rates and sales premiums for developers and owners. CBRE found that rents were 6–8% higher, and capital values increased by 14–16%.

A Maastricht University study on the effect of BREEAM certification on office buildings in London from 2000–2009 found that these buildings achieved a premium of nearly 20% on rental transactions and around 15% on sales.

== See also ==
- LEED (Leadership in Energy and Environmental Design)
- Sustainable refurbishment
