= Sweett Group =

International physical assets management consultancy

- Industry: Construction, Consultancy
- Founded: 1928
- Headquarters: London, England
- Number of employees: 650
- Website: sweettgroup.com

Sweett Group, formerly known as Cyril Sweett, is an international physical assets management consultancy. It is part of Currie & Brown.

== History ==
The firm was founded in 1928 by Cyril Sweett. The firm launched an initial public offering on the Alternative Investment Market under the name Cyril Sweett in 2007, raising £26m and valuing the business at £61m. The Group initially expanded throughout the UK and then internationally, with the acquisition of a number of cost management and project management firms, including Burns Bridge, an Australian-based project management firm, and in July 2010, Widnell, the biggest independent cost management firm in Asia. The organisation was rebranded as Sweett Group in July 2011, consolidating the Group's existing brands.

The firm was acquired by the Jersey-based Currie & Brown in August 2016, and the firm's old website now redirects to Currie & Brown.
