= McGraw (surname) =

McGraw or MacGraw is a surname of Irish and Scottish origin. McGraw has been theorized to be a variant of McCrae, which itself is an Anglicized form of the Gaelic Mag Raith, a patronymic arising from the byname Rath, meaning "grace" or "prosperity". Another source suggests that McGraw is a Northern Irish variant of McGrath.

Notable people with these surnames are:

In acting:

- Ali MacGraw (born 1939), American actress and model
- Charles McGraw (1914–1980), American actor
- Madeleine McGraw (born 2008), American actress
- Melinda McGraw (born 1968), American actress
- Violet McGraw (born 2011), American child actress

In politics:

- Andrew McGraw (1938–2017), Pennsylvania politician
- Darrell McGraw (1936–2024), lifelong West Virginian and a Democratic politician
- Désirée McGraw, Canadian politician
- John McGraw (governor) (1850–1910), Republican Governor of Washington state from 1893 to 1897
- Joseph McGraw (born 1930), Oklahoma politician
- Louis-Philippe McGraw (born 1971), Canadian politician and lawyer
- Perrin H. McGraw (1822–1899), New York politician
- Warren McGraw (1939–2023), long serving politician and trial lawyer in West Virginia

In literature:

- Eloise McGraw (1915–2000), American children's author
- Erin McGraw (born 1957), American fiction author
- Gary McGraw (born 1966), American computer scientist and co-author of five best selling books
- Jay McGraw (born 1979), American author of self-help books, son of Phil McGraw (Dr. Phil)
- Seamus McGraw, American journalist and author

In music:

- Hugh McGraw (1931–2017), American Sacred Harp singer
- Sean Patrick McGraw, American country music singer
- Tim McGraw (born 1967), American country singer and actor

In sports:

- Allan McGraw (1939–2023), Scottish football player and manager and father of Mark McGraw
- Bob McGraw (1895–1978), American baseball player
- Bugsy McGraw (born 1944), American wrestler
- Ian McGraw (1926–2014), Scottish footballer
- Joe McGraw (1874–1951), Australian rugby league administrator
- John McGraw (1873–1934), American Hall of Fame baseball player and manager
- John McGraw (pitcher) (1890–1967), American baseball player
- Jon McGraw (born 1979), American football player
- Marcus McGraw (born 1989), American football player
- Mark McGraw (born 1971), Scottish football player and son of Allan McGraw
- Muffet McGraw (born 1955), American women's basketball coach
- Rick McGraw (1955–1985), American wrestler
- Rodney McGraw (born 2002), American football player
- Thurman "Fum" McGraw (1927–2000), American football player
- Tom McGraw (born 1967), former Major League Baseball pitcher
- Tug McGraw (1944–2004), American baseball player and father of Tim McGraw
- Zac McGraw (born 1997), American-Canadian soccer player

In business:

- Curtis McGraw (1895–1953), son of James H. McGraw and president of McGraw-Hill from 1950 to 1953
- Donald Cushing McGraw (1897–1974), son of James H. McGraw and president of McGraw-Hill from 1953 to 1966
- James H. McGraw (1860–1948), co-founder of The McGraw-Hill Companies and president of the company from 1917 to 1928
- Harold McGraw Jr. (1918–2010), grandson of James H. McGraw and CEO of McGraw-Hill from 1975 to 1983
- Harold McGraw III (born 1948), executive of The McGraw-Hill Companies and great-grandson of its co-founder, James H. McGraw
- Max McGraw (1883–1964), American entrepreneur

In other fields:

- Elaine M. McGraw, American computer programmer
- Elizabeth McGraw, American biologist
- Eric McGraw (1945–2021), British publisher and prison reform activist
- Francis X. McGraw (1918–1944), United States Army soldier
- H. Suzanne McGraw (born 1967), American lawyer and judge
- James McGraw (born 1956), American ecologist
- Jennie McGraw (1840–1881), millionaire philanthropist and daughter of John McGraw
- John McGraw (merchant) (1815–1877), New York lumber tycoon
- John McGraw (brigadier general) (1912–1976), flight surgeon during World War II
- Myrtle Byram McGraw (1899–1988), American psychologist
- Peter McGraw (born 1970), American behavioral scientist
- Phil McGraw (born 1950), American psychologist and TV personality
- Tam McGraw (1952–2007), Scottish fugitive

In fiction:

- Feathers McGraw, character in the Wallace & Gromit franchise
- Quick Draw McGraw, fictional cartoon character, first appeared in 1959
- Spoofer McGraw, British comic strip character

== See also ==
- McGrath (disambiguation)
- Clan McGrath
