= McGrath =

McGrath or MacGrath derives from the Irish surname Mac Craith and is occasionally spelled with a space, i.e. Mc Grath. In Ireland, it is pronounced "Mack Grah" "Mick Grah" or "Ma Grah". In Australia and New Zealand, it is pronounced "MuhGrah".

Notable people with the surname include:

== Academics ==
- Elizabeth McGrath (art historian) (born 1945), British art historian and academic
- Patrick McGrath (psychologist) (born 1948), Canadian psychologist
- Sarah McGrath (born 1972), American philosopher
- William Thomas McGrath (1918–1999), Canadian penologist

== Artists and entertainers ==
=== Actors, directors, and screenwriters ===
- Alethea McGrath (1920–2016), Australian actress
- Bob McGrath (1932–2022), American actor, known for Sesame Street
- Dan McGrath (1964–2025), American screenwriter and director
- Derek McGrath (born 1951), Canadian actor
- Douglas McGrath (1958–2022), American screenwriter, director, and actor
- Frances McGrath (born 1895/1896), American actress
- Frank McGrath (1903–1967), American actor
- Joseph McGrath (born 1928), Scottish film director
- Judith McGrath (1947–2017), Australian actress
- Katie McGrath (born 1983), Irish actress

=== Musicians ===
- Eamon McGrath (born 1988), Canadian indie rock musician
- Gunner McGrath (born 1978), American vocalist and guitarist
- Mark McGrath (born 1968), American rock vocalist
- Alex McGrath (born 1969), UK rock vocalist & actor

=== Writers and poets ===
- Campbell McGrath (born 1962), American poet
- Eamonn McGrath (1929–2008), Irish novelist
- Harold MacGrath (1871–1932), American novelist and screenwriter
- Patrick McGrath (novelist) (born 1950), British novelist
- Seán mac Ruaidhrí Mac Craith (fl. 14th century), author of Caithréim Thoirdhealbhaigh
- Thomas McGrath (poet) (1916–1990), American poet
- Wendy McGrath, Canadian poet and novelist

=== Other artists and entertainers ===
- James McGrath (artist) (born 1969), Australian artist and architect
- Rory McGrath (born 1956), British comedian

== Athletes ==
- Andrew McGrath (born 1998), Australian rules footballer
- Atle Lie McGrath (born 2000), Norwegian skier
- Chase McGrath (born 1998), American football player
- Craig McGrath (rugby union) (born 1974), former New Zealand rugby union player
- Felix McGrath (born 1963), former American World Cup alpine skier
- Glenn McGrath (born 1970), Australian former cricketer
- Jamie McGrath (born 1996), Irish footballer
- Jeremy McGrath (born 1971), American Motocross/Supercross champion
- John McGrath (English footballer) (1938–1998), English footballer and football manager
- Kyle McGrath (born 1992), American baseball player
- Marion Mott-McGrath (1940–2023), Australian chess player
- Mick McGrath (footballer) (1936–2025), Irish footballer
- Mick McGrath (athlete) (born 1947), Australian triple jumper
- Mick McGrath (rugby union) (born 1991), Irish rugby player
- Paul McGrath (footballer) (born 1959), Irish footballer
- Robbie McGrath (born 1951), former Irish rugby union international
- Sean McGrath (American football) (born 1987), American National Football League player
- Tahlia McGrath (born 1995), Australian cricketer
- Tim McGrath (born 1970), former Australian rules footballer

== Businesspeople ==
- Kevin McGrath (born 1963), British businessman
- Tom McGrath (media executive) (born 1956), American media executive
- William L. McGrath (1894–1975), American business executive

== Clergy ==
- Alister McGrath (born 1953), Anglican theologian
- Desmond McGrath (1935–2009), Canadian politician and Catholic priest
- Michael McGrath (bishop) (1882–1961), Roman Catholic Archbishop of Cardiff, Wales
- Patrick J. McGrath (1945–2023), Roman Catholic Bishop of San Jose, California

== Politicians ==
- Amy McGrath (born 1975), retired US Marine and politician
- Charles McGrath (politician) (1872–1934), Australian politician
- J. Howard McGrath (1903–1966), American politician
- James McGrath (Australian politician) (born 1974), Australian senator
- James McGrath (Canadian politician) (1932–2017), Canadian politician
- Joseph McGrath (Irish politician) (1887–1966), Irish politician
- Linda McGrath, American politician
- Michael A. McGrath (1942–2021), American politician
- Patrick McGrath (Irish politician) (died 1956), Irish politician
- Paul McGrath (politician) (born 1948), Irish politician
- Roy McGrath (1969–2023), American politician and fugitive
- William McGrath (1916–1992), Northern Irish Loyalist and convicted paedophile

== Others ==
- Patrick McGrath (Irish republican) (1894–1940), a senior member of the Irish Republican Army
- Rae McGrath (born 1947), British campaigner against landmines
- Raymond McGrath (1903–1977), Australian architect

== See also ==
- Clan McGrath
- Justice McGrath (disambiguation)
