= McGrath (disambiguation) =

McGrath is a surname of Irish origin.

McGrath may also refer to:

== Places ==
United States:

- McGrath, Alaska, a village
- McGrath, Minnesota, a town
- McGrath State Beach, Oxnard, California

Antarctica:

- Mount McGrath
- McGrath Nunatak

== Other uses ==
- McGrath Foundation, an Australian breast cancer support and education charity
- McGrath Cup, a Gaelic Football competition in Munster, Ireland
- McGrath's Fish House, restaurant chain in the American Pacific Northwest

== See also ==
- Clan McGrath
- Magrath (disambiguation)
- McGraw (disambiguation)
