= John Magrath (disambiguation) =

John Magrath may refer to:

- John D. Magrath, American soldier in the U.S. Army
- John Macrory Magrath, chief historian to the O'Briens of Ireland
- John Richard Magrath, British academic and administrator at the University of Oxford
- Sir John Magrath, 1st Baronet (d. c. 1652) of the Magrath Baronets
- Sir John Magrath, 3rd Baronet (d. c. 1670) of the Magrath Baronets

== See also ==
- Magrath (disambiguation)
- John McGrath (disambiguation)
