= McGraw-Hill (disambiguation) =

McGraw-Hill Education is an educational publisher and digital learning company.

McGraw-Hill may also refer to:

- S&P Global, an American financial corporation formerly known as McGraw-Hill
- McGraw-Hill Telescope at MDM Observatory, American astronomical observatory
- 4432 McGraw-Hill, an asteroid named in honor of the telescope

== See also ==
- McGraw-Hill Building (disambiguation)
- Tim McGraw and Faith Hill, a celebrity couple
