= MacCraith =

Mac Craith (Meic Craith, plural form), meaning "Son of Grace", is an Irish surname, one branch of which is rendered McGrath.

== Alternate forms ==
Among many alternate forms are McCragh, Crah, Crow and Crowe. Some of the forms may link the Mac Craith name to the ancestral name MacConcrada.

== Historical mentions ==
At least two distinct families named Mac Craith lived in medieval Ireland.

The Meic Craith of Thomond were a learned family with close ties to Clare Abbey, an Augustinian foundation. They were historians and poets of the Uí Bhriain kings and earls of Thomond.

Another family of the name, not known to be related, were natives of Termon McGrath, Lough Erne.

== Notables ==
Members of the Thomond family recorded in the Irish annals included:

- Mac Raith, son of Cú Dub, eminent chief of Clann Scandláin of Dál Cais, the best "ex-layman" since Nár, son of Guaire, for piety and bestowing of food to poor people, rested in Christ in Mungarit in 1067.
- The son of Mac Raith, the poet, rested in Christ in 1097
- Eoghan mac Donagh Mhaoil Mac Craith, died 1240
- MacCraith a Tarthoir (the Protector), died 1395
- Aedh Mac Craith, Junior, whose lands were despoiled by Lord Furnival in 1415
- Owen MacCraith, died 1450
- Sean mac Ruaidhri MacCraith, died 1580

Other notable members of the family include:

- Seán mac Ruaidhrí Mac Craith (fl. 14th-century), author of Caithréim Thoirdhealbhaigh
- Mathghamhain Mág Raith, Bishop of Killaloe, Bishop of Killaloe, 1389–1400
- Donatus Mág Raith, O.S.A., Bishop of Killaloe, 1400–1421
- Thaddaeus Mág Raith I, Bishop of Killaloe, 1423–1433
- Thaddaeus Mág Raith II, Bishop of Killaloe, 1460–1463
- Miler Magrath (1523? – 1622), Archbishop of Cashel
- Aindreas MacCraith (1723–1790) known as An Mangaire Sugach (The Jolly Merchant), buried in Kilmallock
- John Magrath, soldier in the Irish Rebellion of 1798
- Andrew Gordon Magrath (1813–1893), Governor of Carolina, his son

== See also ==
- Clan McGrath
