= 20 Canada Square =

Office building in Canary Wharf, London, England

Coordinates: 51°30′14″N 00°01′0″W

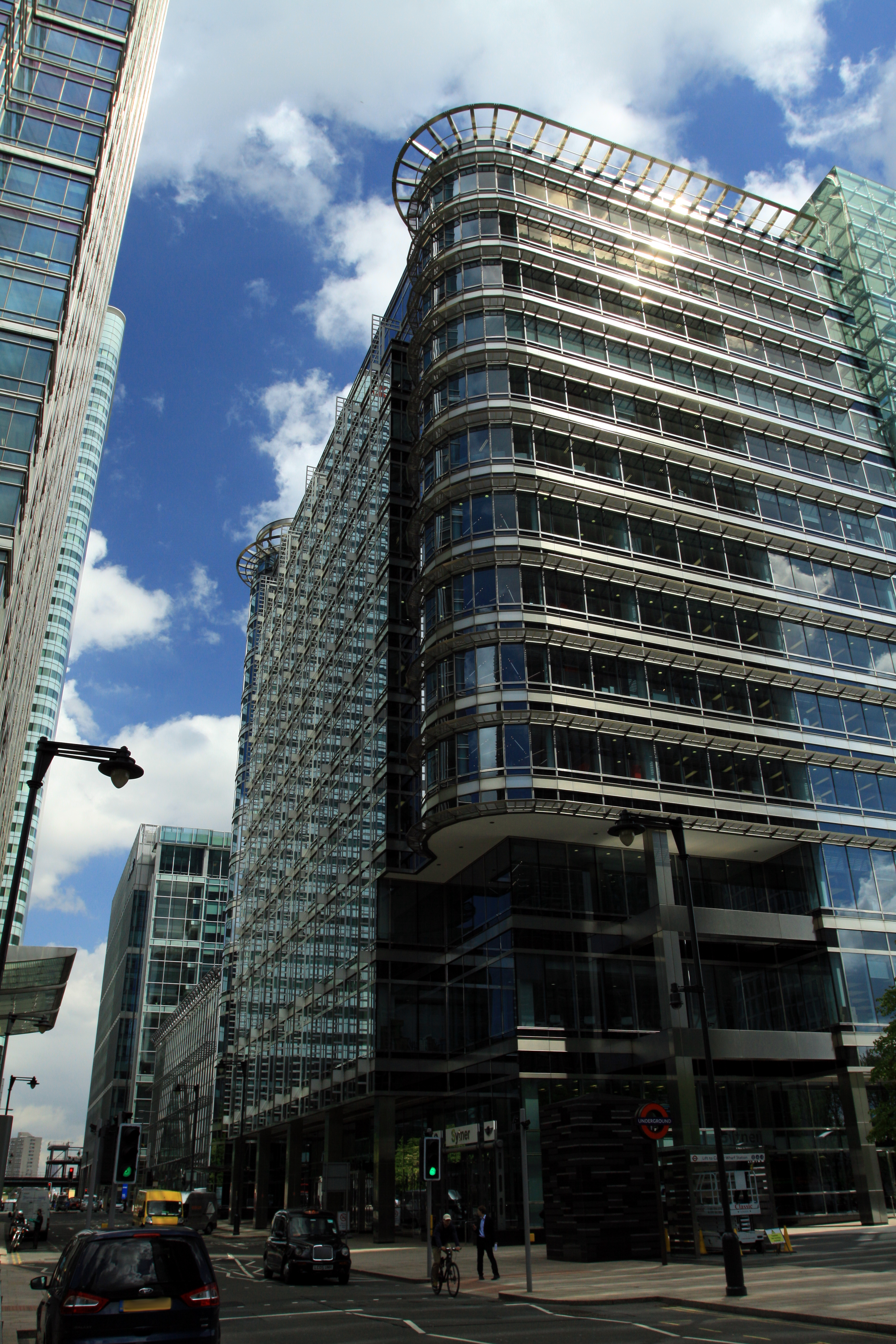
- (2013)
- Interactive map of the 20 Canada Square area

General information
- Status: Completed
- Architectural style: postmodernism
- Construction started: 2000
- Completed: 2003

Design and construction
- Architect: Skidmore, Owings & Merrill

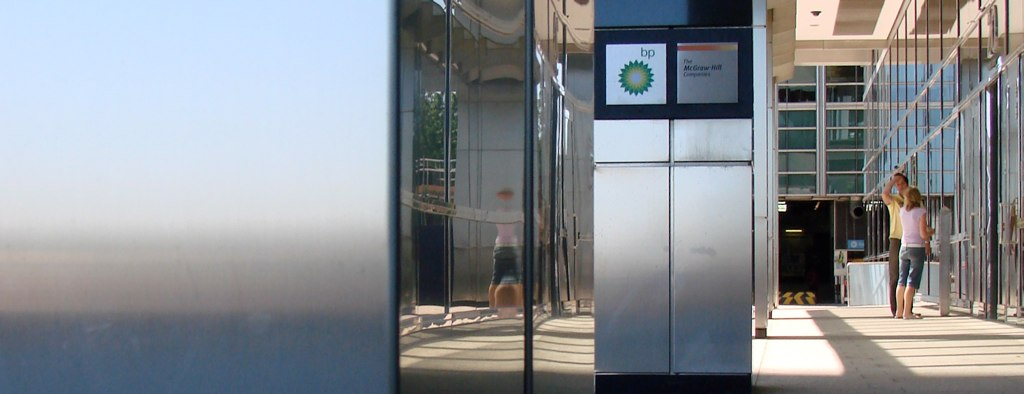
The building entrance

20 Canada Square is an office building located in the Canary Wharf section of London. Currently, 20 Canada Square is vacant. The building is divided into twelve floors.

Previous tenants have included BP and S&P Global.

In June 2023, the building was taken into receivership, following the non-repayment of a loan owed by its owner, Cheung Kei Group.
