= Douglas L. Peterson =

American businessperson and entrepreneur

Douglas Peterson
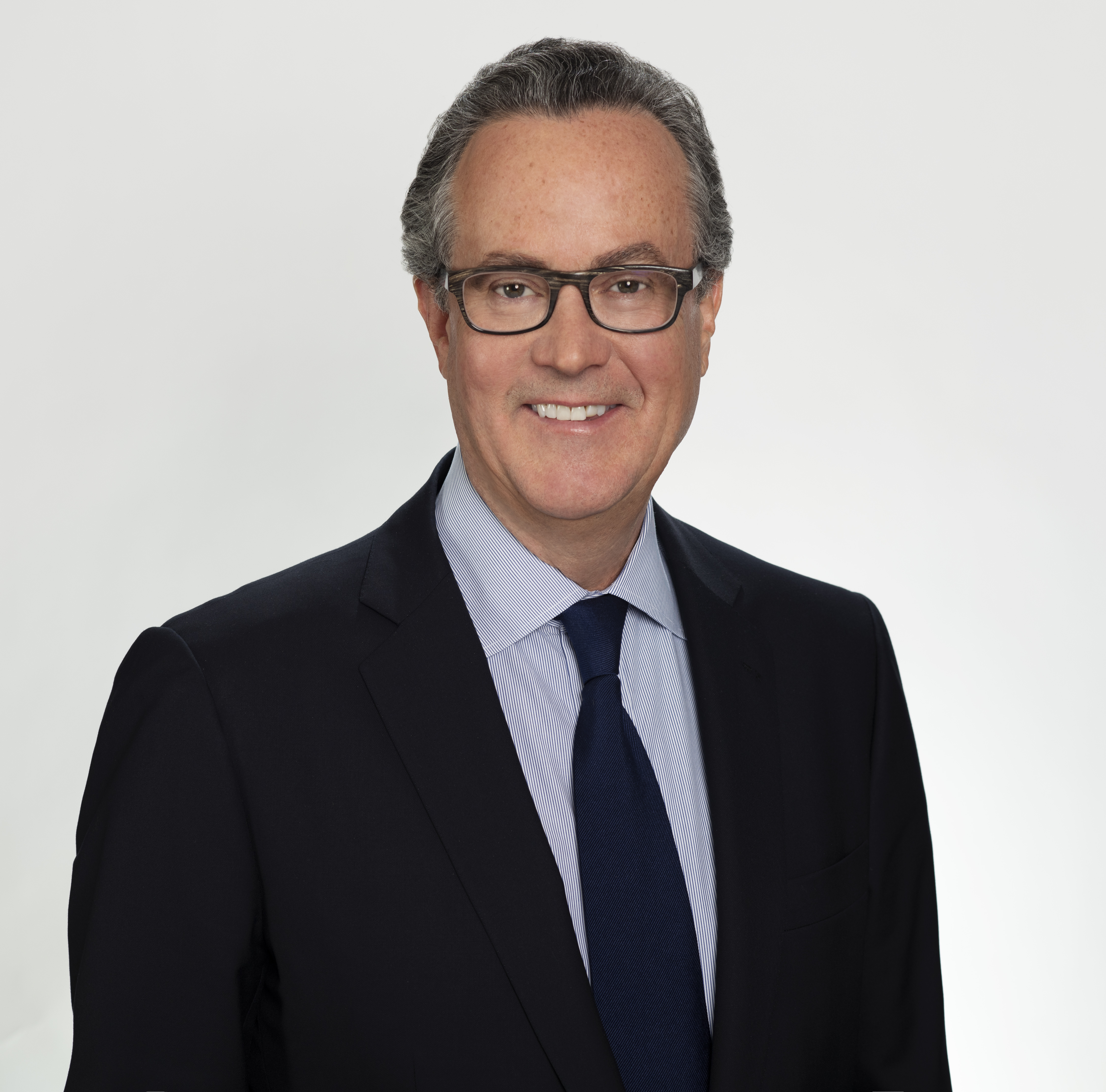
- Peterson in 2019
- Education: BA, Claremont McKenna College, MBA, University of Pennsylvania
- Title: CEO of S&P Global
- Board member of: S&P Global; Kravis Leadership Institute; Claremont McKenna College; Paul Taylor Dance Company; National Bureau of Economic Research; U.S.-Japan Council; Japan Society; United Nations Global Compact
- Children: 2

Douglas L. Peterson is the former president and chief executive officer of S&P Global (NYSE: SPGI), formerly McGraw Hill Financial. He became president and chief executive officer in November 2013. Peterson has served on S&P Global's Board of Directors since July 2013. In November 2024 Peterson retired from the position of CEO, with S&P Global Ratings President Martina Cheung replacing him. Doug originally joined the company as president of Standard & Poor's Ratings Services in 2011.

== Education ==
Peterson was raised in Santa Fe, New Mexico, received his undergraduate degree from Claremont McKenna College and earned his MBA from the Wharton School at the University of Pennsylvania in 1985.

== Career ==
=== Citigroup ===
Peterson worked for Citigroup for 26 years. From 2004 to 2010 Peterson was the CEO of Citigroup Japan. He served as chief auditor of Citigroup from 2001 to 2004. He described the appointment to chief auditor as a pivotal moment in his career. Other positions within Citigroup include serving as country manager for Uruguay from 1995 to 1998 and for Costa Rica from 1991 to 1995. Peterson also served as chief operating officer of Citibank from 2010 to 2011.

=== S&P Global ===
Peterson became president and CEO of S&P Global in November 2013, and has served on its Global Board of Directors since July 2013. Early in his tenure as CEO, Peterson divested non-core businesses such as McGraw Hill Construction and J.D. Power. He stated that the purpose of these divestitures was to focus the company's portfolio on the financial intelligence business. As part of this strategy, Peterson oversaw the acquisition of financial data and analytics businesses, including SNL Financial.

In 2016, Peterson announced that the company was changing its name from McGraw Hill Financial to S&P Global and spoke about the company's recent attempts to modernize and rebrand itself. During this time, the company expanded its operations in Asia. In 2016, the company acquired a large interest in Thai rating company, TRIS Rating. The company is also the majority owner of India's leading credit rating agency and global analytics company, CRISIL. Later that year, S&P Global acquired Trucost, an environmental data and analytics company.

Peterson has overseen investments in the areas of technological innovation, analytics, and environmental, social and governance (ESG) data. In 2018, he oversaw S&P Global's acquisitions of Kensho, an artificial intelligence firm, and global trade data company Panjiva in 2018. In 2019, the company announced it was acquiring RobecoSAM's ESG tool. S&P Global also announced its intentions to build a domestic credit rating agency in China. In 2019, Chinese regulators gave the company approval to operate in China's domestic bond market.

In 2020, he oversaw S&P Global's largest acquisition, reaching an all-stock $44bn deal to acquire IHS Markit. The deal was completed in February 2022.

In 2023, Peterson's total compensation from S&P Global was $19.5 million, or 445 times the median employee pay at S&P Global for that year.

In June 2024, S&P Global announced that it had appointed Martina Cheung as CEO effective on 1 November. Peterson will remain as a member of the board until May 2025, and as a special advisor to S&P Global until 31 December 2025.

== Other ventures ==
Peterson was named to the Business Roundtable’s board of directors and selected as chairman of the Roundtable's Smart Regulation Committee in 2018. He was succeeded by Lynn Good in 2022.

In 2020, Peterson was elected chair of the U.S.-Japan Council. In 2021, he led a workstream of the G7's Impact Taskforce focused on mobilizing private capital by advocating for globally consistent standards to measure, value, and account for sustainability. In 2023, the UN Secretary-General appointed Peterson to the board of United Nations Global Compact.

Peterson has previously served as co-chair of the Stewardship Board of the Platform for Shaping the Future of Cities at the World Economic Forum. He has also been a member of the International Business Council, a member of the US-China Business Council, and a Governor of the Financial Services Industry Community. Peterson is also a boardmember of National Bureau of Economic Research.

Peterson is a member of the Council on Foreign Relations and the Federal Deposit Insurance Corporation's Systemic Resolution Advisory Committee.

== Awards and recognition ==
In 2019, Doug Peterson was included on Harvard Business Review's The CEO 100, an annual list of the world's top chief executives.

== Nonprofit work ==
Peterson serves on the boards of advisors for the Kravis Leadership Institute and the Partnership for New York City. Peterson is a member of the board of trustees for Claremont McKenna College and is also on the board for Paul Taylor Dance Company and the Japan Society.

== Personal ==
Peterson is married and has two sons.
