= McGraw =

McGraw or MacGraw may refer to:

- McGraw (surname)
- McGraw, New York
- McGraw-Hill Education, a publishing and education corporation

== See also ==
- McGrawville, New York
