= John McGrath =

John McGrath may refer to:

== Politicians ==
- John J. McGrath (1872–1951), U.S. representative from California
- John McGrath (New South Wales politician) (1893–1971), Labor member of the New South Wales Legislative Assembly
- John McGrath (Victorian politician) (1939–2021), National member of the Victorian Legislative Assembly
- John McGrath (Western Australian politician) (born 1947), Liberal member of the Western Australian Legislative Assembly

== Footballers ==
- John McGrath (footballer, born 1932) (born 1932), football inside forward (Notts County and Darlington 1955–59)
- John McGrath (footballer, born 1938) (1938–1998), English football centre half (Bury, Newcastle and Southampton 1955–73), later manager
- John McGrath (Irish footballer) (born 1980), Irish footballer
- Jay McGrath (John-Alan McGrath, born 2003), Irish footballer

== Hurlers ==
- John McGrath (Tipperary hurler) (born 1994), Irish hurler
- John McGrath (Westmeath hurler) (1928–1980), Irish hurler

== Other sportsmen ==
- John McGrath (shot putter), winner of the 1966 USA Indoor Track and Field Championships
- Jack McGrath (racing driver) (1919–1955), American racecar driver
- John McGrath (ice hockey), Canadian ice hockey player and political advisor

== Performing arts ==
- John McGrath (artistic director) (born 1962), British artistic director and CEO of Manchester International Festival
- John McGrath (playwright) (1935–2002), Liverpudlian-Irish playwright

== Others ==
- John McGrath (businessman), Australian businessperson
- John W. McGrath (1842–1905), American jurist
- Denis McGrath (lawyer) (John Denis McGrath, 1910–1986), New Zealand lawyer and politician
- Sir John McGrath (judge) (1945–2018), judge of the Supreme Court of New Zealand
- J. C. McGrath (John Christie "Ian" McGrath; born 1949), British retired pharmacologist, physiologist, and academic

== See also ==
- John Magrath (disambiguation)
