= Parker Migliorini International =

American meat broker company

- Legal status: Company
- Location: Salt Lake City, United States
- Services: Food distribution
- Key people: Darin Parker (CEO)
- Website: pmifoods.com

Parker Migliorini International (PMI Foods) is a multinational food distributor founded in 2009 through the merger of Parker International and Meridonial Meat Import & Export Ltd. The company is currently headed by Darin Parker and distributes a variety of food products across six continents.

== History ==
Parker International was founded in 1992 in Salt Lake City, Utah. It established as a joint venture with Meridional Meat Import & Export Ltd, a company formed in 1995 in Porto Alegre, Brazil.

Parker International merged with the Migliorini family's enterprise to form Parker Migliorini International (PMI Foods). The merged entity became a global enterprise with an annual trade volume exceeding 1.6 billion pounds (approximately 725.7 million kilograms) of beef, pork, chicken, seafood, and eggs, generating around US$3 billion in revenues. It sources protein from multiple regions, including North America, Australia, and Uruguay, to meet China’s regulatory requirements.

As of 2025, PMI Foods operates in more than 60 countries, and employs over 800 staff worldwide.

== Business Model ==
PMI Foods specializes in the sourcing and distribution of food products, including meat, dairy, seafood, fruits, and vegetables. PMI Foods operates through three main business platforms: Global Solutions, Distribution, and Food Service.

== Operations ==
=== China ===
PMI exports high-protein foods to China. According to data from Panjiva, PMI Foods is involved in beef trade between Brazil and China and shipped more than US$1.7 billion in Brazilian beef over the past decade.

The company’s entry into that market occurred indirectly through sales of beef products to Hong Kong, which at the time served as a standard entry point into mainland China. Darin Parker, the company's founder, began working in Asian markets around 25 years ago, initially focusing on food distribution in Japan, South Korea, and Taiwan. Parker noted that the early markets evolved at different speeds, with Japan developing slowly and presenting significant challenges for foreign businesses, while China’s market progressed more rapidly, allowing the application of strategies learned elsewhere.

Due to limited attention in Hong Kong, the company shifted operations directly to Guangzhou in southern China. Over time, China became a primary market, accounting for approximately 60 percent of the company’s global sales. PMI Foods has established a significant presence in the Chinese market.

Market access has varied over time. After detecting Bovine Spongiform Encephalopathy (BSE), Chinese authorities banned U.S. beef imports, prompting the company to adapt its sourcing. This ban was eventually lifted, and China subsequently allowed a wider range of U.S. chicken products. In 2018, at the height of the US/China trade war, PMI Foods ceased importing US cuts of meat into China as tariffs imposed by Beijing drove prices up.

Approximately 60% of its global sales are generated through Chinese distribution channels.

== Controversies ==
In 2012, PMI Foods was accused by the FBI of violations of the Foreign Corrupt Practices Act. Two years later, a company related to PMI Foods pleaded guilty to one misdemeanor count of making false statements on a shipping document and paid a $1 million fine to resolve the matter.

An investigation conducted by the Associated Press and the Rainforest Investigation Network in 2023 reported that PMI Foods imported $1.7 billion worth of Brazilian beef to China and other countries in the preceding ten years. The investigation stated that the imported beef was supplied by JBS S.A., a Brazilian meat processing company that Brazilian prosecutors have repeatedly accused of buying cattle raised in deforested land.
