= McGraw–Hill Building =

McGraw–Hill Building may refer to:

- 330 West 42nd Street, a landmark building in Manhattan, New York City, built in 1930
- 1221 Avenue of the Americas, in Manhattan, New York City, built in 1969
- McGraw–Hill Building (Chicago), a landmark building in Chicago, Illinois

== See also ==
- McGraw-Hill (disambiguation)
- McGraw Hill Financial
- McGraw–Hill Education
