= Sleady Castle =

Castle in Ireland

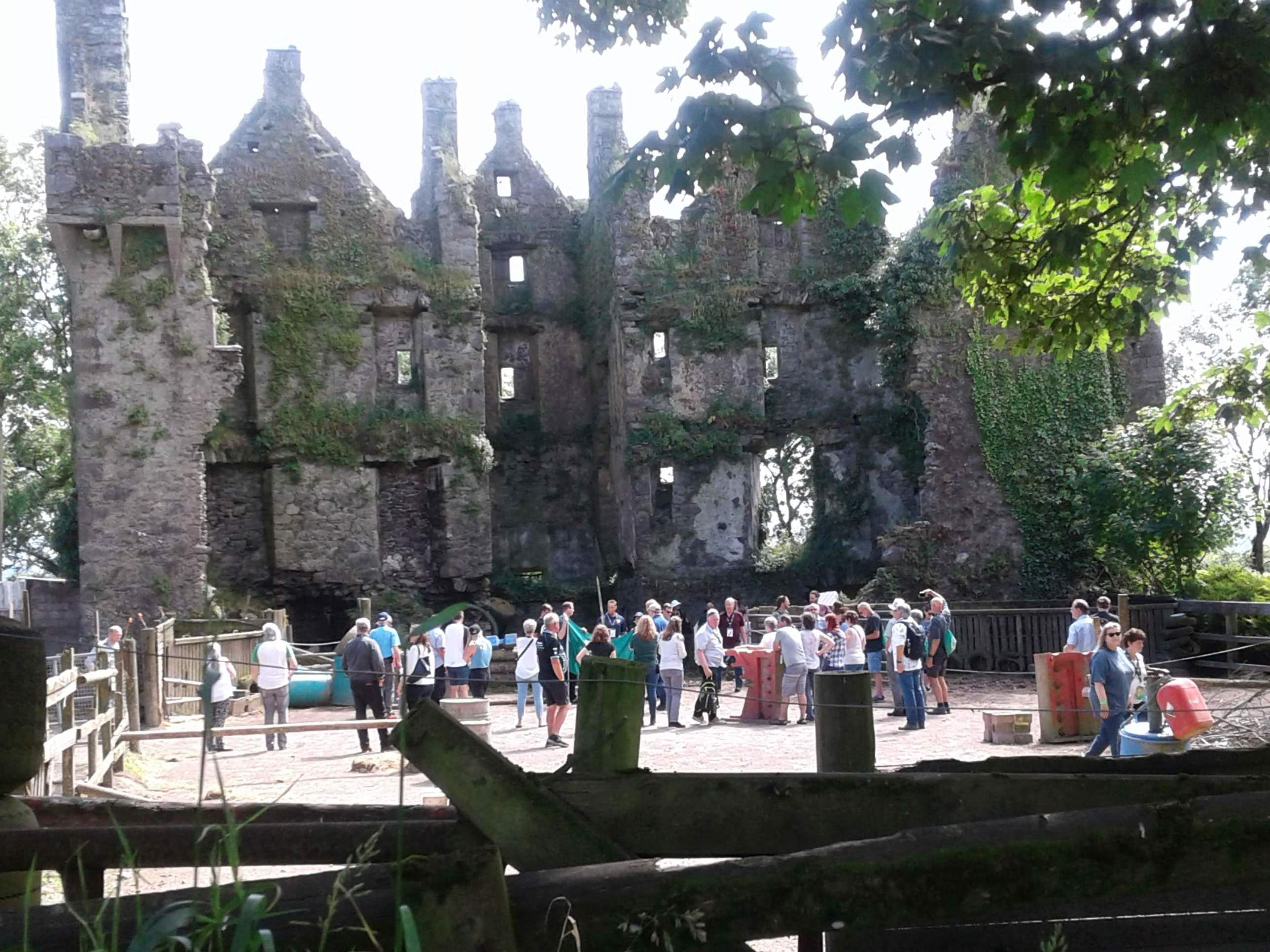
- Sleady Castle, June, 2019

- Location within Ireland

General information
- Architectural style: Jacobian
- Location: County Waterford, Ireland, Ireland
- Coordinates: 52°10′06.6″N 7°43′31.2″W
- Completed: 1628; 398 years ago

Sleady Castle was built in 1628 by Philip McGrath. It is located in County Waterford, Ireland, approximately 10 miles (16 kilometers) from Lismore and Dungarvan. Both Lismore and Dungarvan have ancestral connections to the Clan McGrath. They were patrons to the Augustinian Abbey, at Abbeyside, Dungarvan, and have ancestral graves within its walls. Philip McGrath is a 4th generation decedent of Dónal McGrath who was buried in 1548, in the Church of Ireland Cathedral in Lismore.

Around 1640 the McGraths were expelled from Sleady and the lands associated with it were given to Sir Richard Osbourne by the English Crown. John O'Keeffe is referenced as an owner in a June 16, 1876, Landed Estates Court Notice. In 1957 Sleady was sold at auction to a Mr. Doocey. Sleady is currently owned by John Hickey who bought it in 1970. His daughter Joanne Hickey manages the property. Her family has a long history with Sleady Castle as workers for previous landowners. Joanne's grandparents Jack and Brigid Hickey rented Sleady Lodge from 1938.

Sleady Castle has hundreds of visitors in a typical year. Joanne is often there to welcome them and talk about the history of the Castle. It has become a destination for McGrath Clan members. The attached photo was taken in 2019 during a McGrath Clan Gathering tour of the Castle, where Joanne gave a tour and a talked about the Castle's history. She has also undertaken a refurbishment of the grounds surrounding the ruins to enhance the visitor experience. This initiative is called Sleady 400 to mark the 400th anniversary of the Castle in 2028. The project is supported by The United States McCraw Family Association.

== "Sleady Castle and Its Tragedy" ==
"Sledy Castle and Its Tragedy" is an article originally published in the Dublin University Magazine, March 1848, author unknown but it is initialed M. E. M. However, in an August 31, 1888 Waterford News article, William Desmond O'Brian "an accomplished Irish Scholar and gentleman, well versed in the history and traditions of his native country" is attributed to having "contributed an interesting story on 'Sleady Castle and Its Tragedy,' to the Dublin University Magazine somewhat over forty years ago. The story was founded in fact, for, in its main features, it is corroborated by the traditions of the neighborhood."

The article tells the story of the origins of the Castle, its original owners and their demise. The article was republished in 1888 by the Royal Society of Antiquaries of Ireland in the Journal of the Royal Historical and Archaeological Association under the title "Sleady Castle and Its Tragedy", contributed by Gabriel O'C Redmond, Hon. Local Secretary, Co Waterford. This publication includes a short endorsement of the validity of the article by Gabrial O'C Redmond, "The different localities mentioned in the narrative", the "localities" can still be found today.

A similar version of the story can be found in The School's Collection of the National Folklore Collection.
