= Emergency Committee for American Trade =

Between 1967 and 2018, the Emergency Committee for American Trade (ECAT) was a U.S. trade body representing U.S.-based international business enterprises from the principal sectors of the U.S. economy.

In its heyday, ECAT was one of the most powerful of all trade representation bodies for the private sector in the United States alongside the U.S. Chamber of Commerce. In that context, ECAT played a significant role in international negotiations.

Many ECAT staff were former trade diplomats at the USTR, which is part of the Executive Office of the President of the United States.

Some ECAT staff were former Senate staffers. ECAT was dissolved in 2018.

== History ==
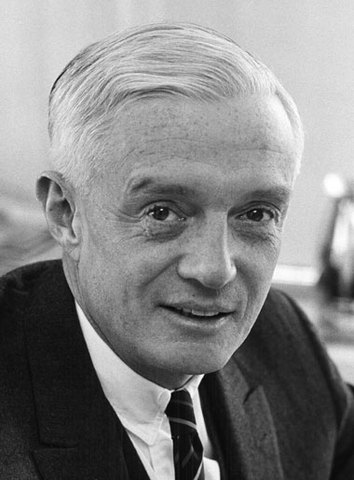
Arthur K. Watson, founder of ECAT. Former CEO of IBM, 21st United States Ambassador to France

ECAT was founded in 1967 by a consortium of American CEOs, who were interested in forwarding free trade and in curbing the trend towards protectionism in U.S. political circles.

Arthur Watson, CEO of IBM was the founding President of ECAT. Watson was joined by a group of U.S. CEOs including David Rockefeller (Chase Manhattan Bank), George Moor (First City National Bank), William Hewitt (Deere & Co), Robert Ingersoll (Borg-Warner Corp), James Linen (Time Inc.), David Packard (Hewlett-Packard), Peter Peterson (Bell & Howell Co), Rudoph Peterson (Bank of America) John Powers Jr. (Chas. Pfizer & co., Inc), James Roche (General Moters Corp), Thomas Taylor (International Packers, Ltd.), Charles B. Thornton (Litton Industries, inc.), Joseph Wilson (Xerox Corp), William Allen (Boeing), George Ball (Lehman Brothers International), William Blackey (Caterpillar Tractor Co.), Hal Dean (Ralston Purina Co.), Henry Ford (Ford Motor Company), J. Peter Grace (W.R. Grace and Co.) and Patrick Haggerty (Texas Instruments Inc.).

On July 24, 1968, Rep. Windnall (R-NJ) published a statement from Mr. Rockfeller in the Congressional Record, "Compete or Retreat: Speech of David Rockefeller to the Southern Governors Conference", in which Rockefeller explained why ECAT has been founded, and its philosophy and early work on trade policy and import quotas.

Robert McNeill was the first ECAT President and was active in supporting ECAT's mission with several administrations and Capitol Hill.

Calman Cohen became the second ECAT President. Cohen led the organization for more than 20 years and was active in pressing ECAT's objectives on Capitol Hill and successive administrations. During his tenure, ECAT actively worked on WTO issues, including the accessions of China to the WTO, trade agreements, including leading the Business Coalition for U.S.-Central American Trade, that supported the negotiation and implementation of the Dominican Republic-Central American Free Trade Agreement.

In December 2016, ECAT President Cohen stated that ECAT would dissolve on his retirement.

== Mandate ==
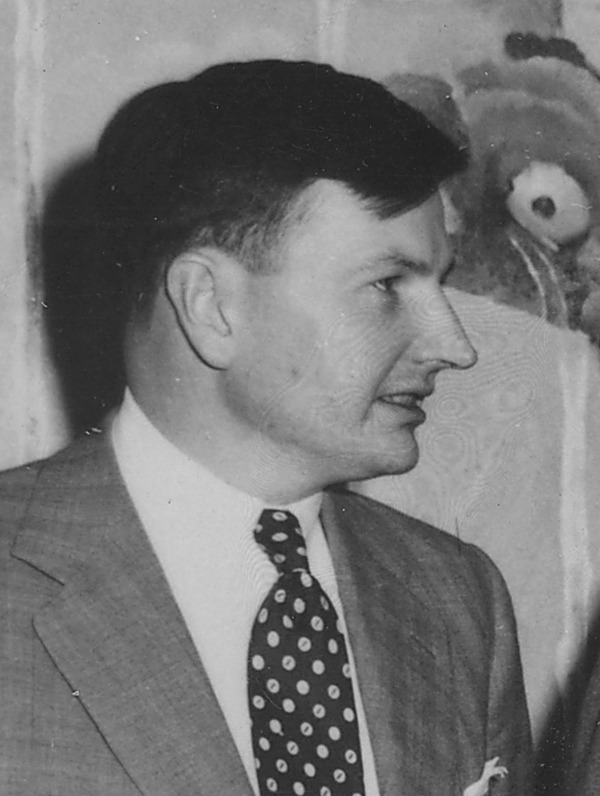
David Rockefeller, co-founded ECAT while CEO of Chase Manhattan Bank and chairman, Council on Foreign Relations

The mandate of ECAT was to "promote economic growth through the expansion of international trade and investment".

At the WTO, ECAT was active during the Kennedy, Tokyo, and Uruguay trade negotiation "Rounds" as well as providing inputs to Doha Round negotiations.

ECAT was very active in bilateral and regional negotiations of the United States, such as the Free Trade Area of the Americas treaty (FTAA), the Central American Free Trade Agreement (CAFTA) negotiations. ECAT was also active in negotiations for the Transatlantic Trade and Investment Partnership (TTIP) and the Trans-Pacific Partnership (TTP).

== Members ==
Many major U.S. headquartered corporations were members of ECAT as seen in their testimony on behalf of ECAT on Capitol Hill. ECAT did not publish its membership lists on its website.

In 2015, an ECAT press-release stated that, "ECAT is an organization of the heads of leading U.S. international business enterprises representing all major sectors of the American economy, with annual worldwide sales exceeding $2.7 trillion and with employment exceeding 6.5 million workers."

Mr. Harold "Terry" McGraw III, the Chairman of ECAT for 2008–2020, is also chairman of the board of McGraw Hill Financial and Chairman of the Executive Board of the International Chamber of Commerce (ICC).

== Functions ==
As a business association, ECAT worked with its member companies to advocate for trade and investment policies, legislation, and other measures that supported its mission. In that capacity, it led outreach to Members of Congress and their staff and successive administrations for it corporate members. It represented its members before government bodies, providing oral and written testimony to Congress and the Executive Branch.

Given its focus on international trade and investment issues, ECAT communicated and worked extensively with Members and staff of key House and Senate Committees, including the Senate Finance Committee and the House Ways and Means Committee.

The Agenda for ECAT addressed all facets of U.S. Trade.

== Lobby Organization to Trade Association ==
In 1968, John Robert Vastine Jr., former economic assistant to Rep. Thomas B. Curtis (R Mo.) registered the Emergency Committee for American Trade as a lobbyist organization.

In 1969, ECAT gained exempt status, and filed as a 501(c)(6) organization.

== Dissolution with Cohen retirement ==
The President of ECAT at the time of closure was Calman Cohen. In 2015, the Sunlight Foundation said that "Cohen, who joined in 1981 after working as the congressional liaison at the Office of the United States Trade Representative, the government organization charged with negotiating trade agreements to create “higher living standards for families, farmers, manufacturers, workers, consumers, and businesses.”

In December 2016, ECAT President Calman Cohen stated that ECAT would dissolve on his retirement, stating, *“With the change in the leadership of our country about to take place and after several decades of addressing issues of critical importance to our country, I believe the time is right for me to begin that new chapter in my life,” Cohen said in a statement to Inside U.S. Trade.". Calman noted that “The Emergency Committee for American Trade’s mission remains as important as ever,” he added. “The Committee was established by a number of U.S. business leaders at a time when the rise of protectionism threatened a worldwide trade war.""
