= Maintaining Classroom Discipline =

- Distributed by: McGraw-Hill
- Release date: 1947
- Running time: 13 minutes
- Country: United States
- Language: English

Maintaining Classroom Discipline is a 1947 short film by McGraw-Hill, giving teaching advice to trainee teachers over how to manage secondary school students. The film is 13 minutes long.

In the 2000s academics at University of Northampton in the United Kingdom placed the film on the Behaviour4Learning website; by February 2009 it had a view count that exceeded 3,000, and was described by Kerra Madern of The Times Educational Supplement as "consistently the most popular resource on the website." In 2009 Donald MacLeod of The Guardian wrote that among British primary and secondary school instructors, the film "has taken off".

== Reception ==
Richard H. Williams, of the University of Wisconsin, stated in a 1953 journal article that the film "performs an adequate function in displaying good classroom management procedures."
