= Magrath (surname) =

Magrath is a surname. Notable people with the surname include:

- Andrew Gordon Magrath (1813–1893), last Confederate Governor of South Carolina
- C. Peter Magrath (born 1933), interim president of West Virginia University
- Cassandra Magrath (born 1981), Australian actress
- Charles Alexander Magrath (1860–1949), surveyor of the Northwest Territories
- Cornelius Magrath (1736–1760), Irish giant
- John Magrath (disambiguation), multiple people
- Miler Magrath (c. 1523 – 1622), Irish religious figure
