= Justin Packard =

American politician

Member-elect of the New Hampshire House of Representatives from the Rockingham 40th district
- Assuming office December 2026
- Succeeding: Linda McGrath

Personal details
- Party: Democratic

Justin Packard is an American politician. A member of the Democratic Party, he is the member-elect for the Rockingham 40th district of the New Hampshire House of Representatives.
