= Kidaptive =

Educational technology

- Founded: California, 2011
- Founder: P.J. Gunsagar, Dylan Arena
- Headquarters: Silicon Valley, California, United States
- Key people: Josine Verhagen (Senior Director of Psychometrics and Data Science), Ashraf Jahangeer (VP of engineering)
- Products: ALP (Adaptive Learning Platform), Hodoo English, Learner Mosaic, Leo's Pad
- Services: Infrastructure platform for adaptive learning
- Number of employees: <150
- Website: www.kidaptive.com

Kidaptive was a Silicon Valley–based developer of educational technology. Kidaptive's core product was an adaptive-learning platform, which powered a variety of learning domains, including two Kidaptive-created apps for early learning. Kidaptive was founded by P.J. Gunsagar (co-founder of Prana Studios) and Dylan Arena (Stanford University Learning Scientist). The creative director for Kidaptive's Leo's Pad series was Dan Danko, who had worked on numerous children's television shows, such as Rugrats and Fresh Beat Band.

Investors in the startup included Formation 8, Stanford University, Cambridge University, Menlo Investors, Prana Holdings, New Schools Venture Fund, Veddis Ventures, CrunchFund, and VKRM Ventures.

KidAptive was bought out by McGraw Hill in March 2021, and KidAptive employees transferred into McGraw Hill.

== Products ==
The company's technology was created with the guidance of professional educators, including two Stanford University Professors of Education, Dan Schwartz and Ed Haertel.

=== Adaptive Learning Platform (ALP) ===
Kidaptive's ALP was a Big Data platform that combined information from multiple learning contexts (digital & physical) to create a psychometric profile of each learner.

=== Leo’s Pad ===
Kidaptive launched its first app, Leo's Pad, in December 2012. The app was designed for preschool-aged children and was organized like a TV series, consisting of multiple chapters or “appisodes.” The series starred Leonardo da Vinci as a child, as well as his young friends Galileo Galilei, Marie Curie, Confucius, Phillis Wheatley, and Teresa Carreño.

The app combined education and entertainment as learners participated in a curriculum that integrated physics, math, logic, letters, and art. The activities also helped develop cognitive skills including executive function, working memory, and impulse control.

=== Learner Mosaic ===
Leo's Pad paired with a companion app called Learner Mosaic, which allowed parents to monitor their children's progress, identify areas of cognitive and non-cognitive development that needed more attention, and read research-based tips and recommendations on how to support learning in the real world.

== Awards and recognition ==
Kidaptive founders Arena and Gunsagar presented twice (in Spring 2012 and Winter 2013) at Stanford's student startup accelerator StartX.

Awards for the Leo's Pad series:

- Winner LAUNCH Edu 2013
- Winner Startup World San Francisco 2013
- Winner Academics' Choice Awards for mind-building excellence 2014
