= Curtis McGraw =

American publishing executive (1895-1953)

- Born: October 13, 1895; Madison, New Jersey, US
- Died: September 10, 1953 (aged 57); New York City, New York, US
- Occupation: Publisher
- Parent: James H. McGraw

Curtis Whittlesey McGraw (October 13, 1895 – September 10, 1953) was an American publisher and president of McGraw-Hill from 1950 to 1953.

== Life and career ==
McGraw was born in Madison, New Jersey. He was named after his maternal grandfather, Curtis Whittlesey (1842-1915). He attended the Lawrenceville School, where he captained the basketball team, and then attended Princeton University, where he was captain of the Princeton Tigers football team.

He later joined the company of his father, James H. McGraw. In 1950, Curtis McGraw became the third successive McGraw to be president of McGraw-Hill Publishing, following his father, James H. McGraw Sr., who served until 1953, and his brother, James H. McGraw Jr., who served from 1935 to 1950. Curtis became President and Chairman of the Board of McGraw-Hill Publishing on February 24, 1950, when his brother James resigned from those positions.

A resident of Princeton, New Jersey, he died suddenly at the Carlyle Hotel on 10 September 1953. He had been president of the company at the time of his death and was succeeded as president by his brother Donald C. McGraw.
