= Martina Cheung =

Irish business executive

- Cheung in 2025
- Education: National University of Ireland, Galway
- Occupation: Business executive
- Title: President and CEO of S&P Global
- Term: November 2024 – present
- Predecessor: Douglas L. Peterson

Martina Cheung is an Irish business executive who is CEO and President of S&P Global.

Cheung grew up in Limerick and studied at the National University of Ireland, Galway. She worked at Accenture before joining S&P.

== Career ==
Cheung joined S&P Global in 2010 as vice president of operations for its ratings division. She later led the company's Market Intelligence division and then S&P Global Ratings, its credit ratings business. She led the due diligence for S&P Global's $44 billion acquisition of IHS Markit, announced in 2020.

On 27 June 2024, S&P Global announced that Cheung would succeed Douglas L. Peterson, its chief executive since 2013, and she took over on 1 November 2024. As chief executive, she has led the company's use of artificial intelligence and its expansion into private markets data, including the $1.8 billion purchase of With Intelligence. American Banker ranked her 17th on its list of the most powerful women in finance in 2025, and 12th in 2026.
