= Merced County Times =

- Type: Weekly newspaper
- Owner(s): Mid Valley Publications
- Founder(s): John M. Derby
- Founded: 1964
- Headquarters: 2221 K Street, Merced CA, 95340
- Website: mercedcountytimes.com

Merced County Times is a weekly newspaper serving Merced County in California, USA. Founded in 1964, the Times has a circulation of 5,600 and is published every Thursday. Merced County Times is owned by Mid Valley Publications, an employee owned company

== History ==
Merced County Times was founded in 1964 by John M. Derby on his kitchen table with only a camera and a Remington noiseless typewriter.
