= Magrath =

Magrath may refer to:

- Magrath, Alberta, a town in Cardston County, Alberta, Canada.
- Magrath (surname)
- Mayor Magrath Drive, a roadway in Lethbridge, Alberta

== See also ==
- McGrath (disambiguation)
