= Mid Valley Publications =

Mid Valley Publications is a media company based in Winton, California, founded in 1964 by John M. Derby.

== Newspapers ==
Mid Valley Publications owns and publishes 7 weekly newspapers in the Central Valley of California.

=== Weekly newspapers ===
- Merced County Times - Merced, California
- Mid Valley Times - Reedley, Dinuba, and Sanger, California
- Waterford News - Waterford, California
- Hughson Chronicle - Hughson, California
- Atwater Times - Atwater, California
- Winton Times - Winton, California
- Hilmar Times - Hilmar, California
- Denair Dispatch - Denair, California

== Shoppers and other Specials ==
- Mid Valley Classifieds - Central Valley, California
- Central California Bridal Special - Central Valley, California

== Other publications printed by Mid Valley ==
- Valley Entertainment Monthly, 1993–1994, Turlock, California
