= Harold McGraw Jr. =

American businessman

Harold Whittlesey McGraw Jr. (January 10, 1918 – March 24, 2010) was chief executive officer (CEO) of McGraw-Hill from 1975 to 1983. He joined McGraw-Hill in 1947 and retired in 1988.

== Early life and education ==
He was born in New York City on January 10, 1918. He was the eldest of two sons born to Harold Sr. & Louise (née Higgins) McGraw, and grandson of McGraw-Hill’s co-founder James H. McGraw and his wife, Mildred. McGraw Jr. graduated from Princeton University in 1940. He was a captain in the United States Army Air Forces during World War II.

== Career ==
Early in his career he worked in advertising and book retailing, then joining McGraw-Hill in 1947 as a sale representative. He became president of its book division in 1968, with the division becoming the largest US textbook publisher during his tenure. He was CEO of McGraw-Hill from 1975 to 1983. In 1979, he fended off a hostile takeover of the company by American Express. The following year, McGraw-Hill passed $1 billion annual revenues, according to Bloomberg. During his eight years as CEO of McGraw-Hill, the company's revenue doubled.

In 1983, he created the Business Council for Effective Literacy. In 1984, he founded the Business Press Educational Foundation. He personally funded both organizations in their early years, and built their staffing organizations. When he retired at age 70 in 1988, he was elected chairman emeritus of McGraw-Hill. The McGraw-Hill Companies created the Harold W. McGraw, Jr. Prize in Education in 1988.

He was a president of Princeton University Press, and chairman of the Council for Aid to Education, a vice chairman of the New York Public Library, a trustee of the Guggenheim Museum. He was also a trustee of the United Cerebral Palsy Foundation and the New York City Partnership.

== Awards and honors ==
In 1990, US President George H. W. Bush presented him with the Literacy Award. He was later a recipient of the 1999 Honor Award from the National Building Museum.

== Philanthropy ==
He funded a renovation of the McGraw Rotunda at the New York Public Library at Fifth Avenue, which was named in honor of his parents. In 1998, he endowed the Harold W. McGraw, Jr. Center for Teaching and Learning at his alma mater, Princeton.

== Personal life ==
He married Anne Per-Lee in 1940, and was widowed in 2002. The couple had several children, including Suzanne, Harold III, Robert, and Thomas. His son, Harold McGraw III, also served as CEO of the McGraw-Hill Companies. Harold Jr. died on March 24, 2010, at the age of 92, at his home.
