= Donald C. McGraw =

American publisher (1897–1974)

Donald Cushing McGraw
- Born: 21 May 1897; New Jersey
- Died: 7 February 1974 (aged 76); Boynton Beach, Florida
- Parent: James H. McGraw

Donald Cushing McGraw (21 May 1897 – 7 February 1974) was an American publisher and president of McGraw-Hill from 1953 to 1966. During his time as president, he expanded the company beyond publishing and acquired three industry reference sources: Standard & Poor's, F. W. Dodge Corporation, and Platts. Between 1956 and 1960, McGraw-Hill was one of America's Top 50 performing companies.

== Life and career ==
McGraw was born in New Jersey. He joined the company of his father, James H. McGraw, in 1919.

McGraw's brother Curtis McGraw was serving as president when he died suddenly in September 1953, and Donald had to take over as company president. Under Donald the company opened offices in Virginia in 1957, and the Hightstown Distribution Center was opened in New Jersey in 1958. The F.W. Dodge Corporation was acquired in 1961, and he established a foreign language publishing unit in 1963. McGraw retired as president and chairman in 1968. He was succeeded by Shelton Fisher.

McGraw died in Boynton Beach, Florida.
