= Justice McGrath =

Justice McGrath may refer:

- John W. McGrath (1842–1905), associate justice and chief justice of the Michigan Supreme Court
- Mike McGrath (judge) (born 1947), chief justice of the Montana Supreme Court

== See also ==
- Michael MacGrath (fl. 1980s–2020s), Judge of the Court of Appeal of Ireland, and previously Judge of the High Court of Ireland
