= Seamus McGraw =

American journalist and author

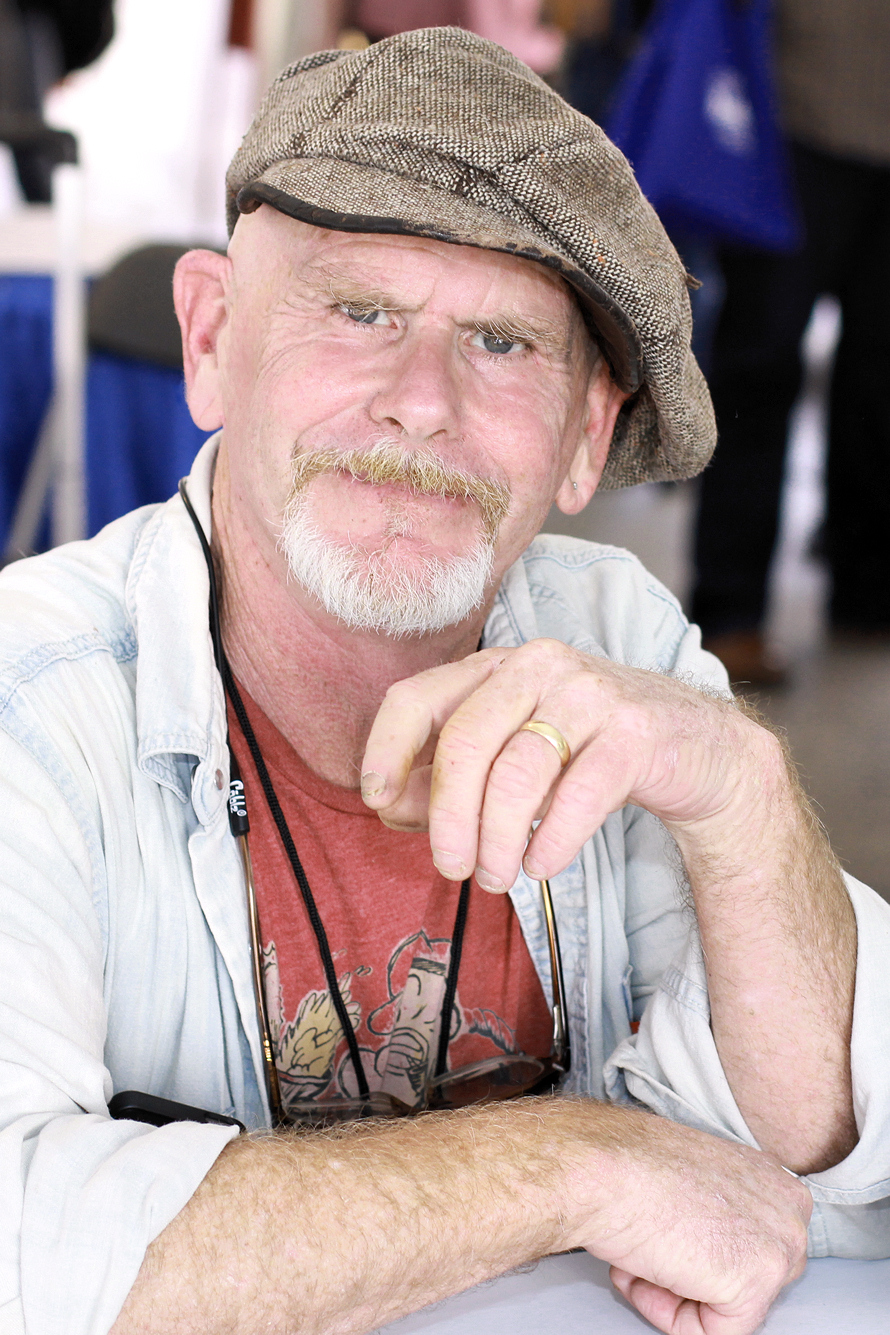
McGraw at the 2018 Texas Book Festival

Seamus McGraw is an American journalist and author.

== Career ==
He has received the Freedom of Information Award from the Associated Press Managing Editors as well as honors from the Casey Foundation and the Society of Professional Journalists. He has written for Playboy, Reader's Digest, Radar, and The Forward. In 2011, Random House published his book entitled The End of Country. He is married with four children and lives in Winona Lakes, Pennsylvania.

== Books ==
- Betting The Farm On A Drought: Stories From The Front Lines of Climate Change, University of Texas Press, 2015.
- The End of Country: Dispatches From The Frack Zone, Random House, 2011.

== Reviews ==
- Kirkus review of Betting the Farm on a Drought
- Sierra Club review of "Betting the Farm on a Drought"
- Kirkus review of The End of Country
- Free Lance–Star review of The End of Country

== Essays and interviews ==
- "The Marcellus Shale", in Pittsburgh Quarterly
- "A Bibliography of Seamus McGraw's articles published in The Forward"
- "The Battle of Lazy Dog Hill", in Vice Magazine
- "The Executioners' Song", in Crime Slam
- Interview with Seamus McGraw on WAMC Public Radio
- "The Grease Car War", in Playboy.
- "Teen Boot Camp: A Deadly Decision?", reprint from Reader's Digest.
