= John McGrath (footballer, born 1932) =

English footballer

Personal information
- Date of birth: 21 May 1932 (age 94)
- Place of birth: Tidworth, England
- Position: Inside forward

Senior career*
Years	Team	Apps	(Gls)
- Aldershot
1955–1958	Notts County	54	(5)
1958–1959	Darlington	25	(6)
–	Boston United		
- * Club domestic league appearances and goals

John McGrath (born 21 March 1932) is an English former footballer who made 79 appearances in the Football League playing as an inside forward for Notts County and Darlington in the 1950s. He also played non-league football for Guisborough Town. He was on the books of Aldershot as an amateur, but never represented them in the league, and later played in the Southern League for Boston United.
