= Linda McGrath =

American politician

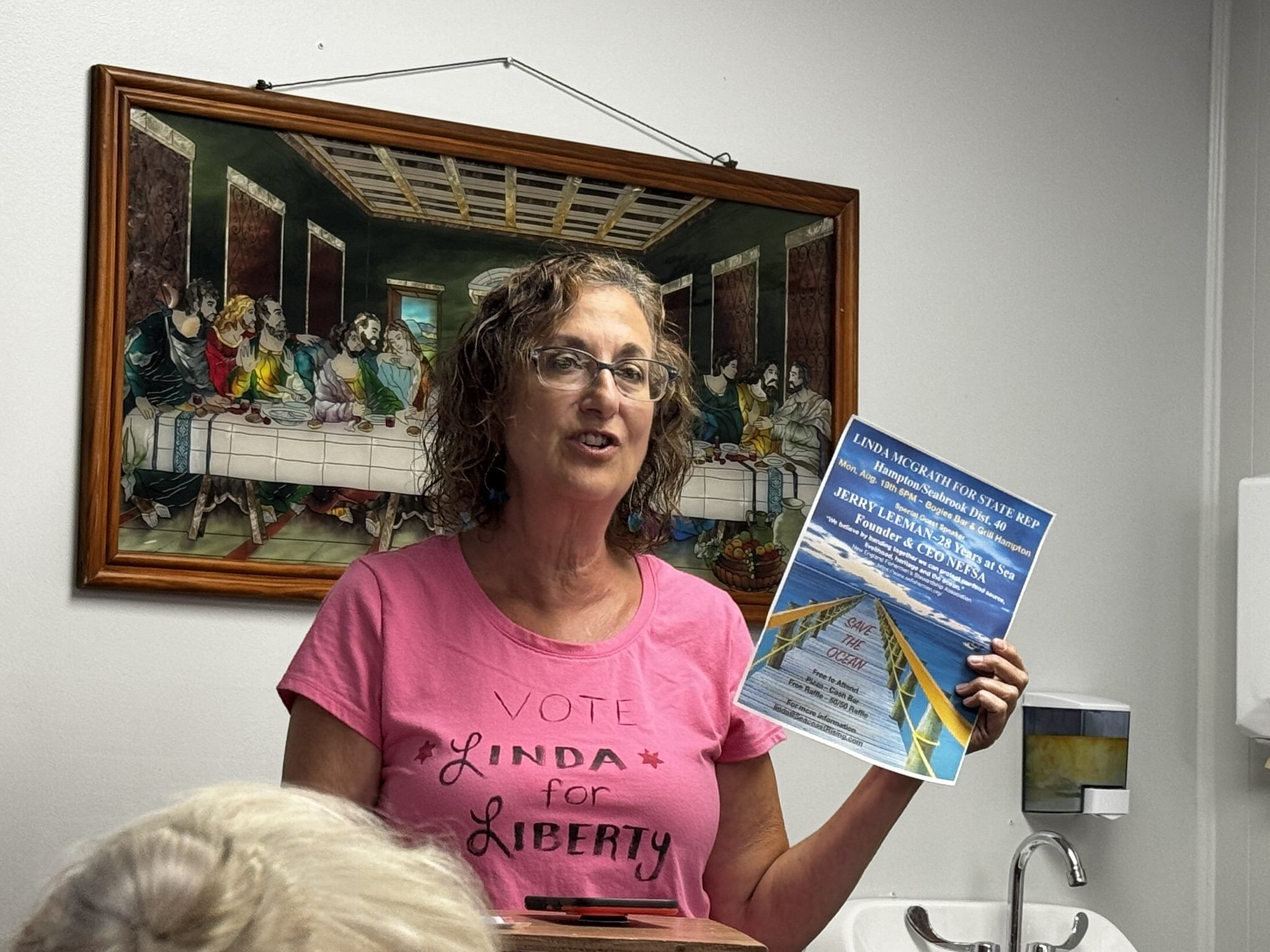

Member of New Hampshire House of Representatives for Rockingham 40
- Incumbent
- Assumed office December 4, 2024
- Preceded by: Jason Janvrin
- Succeeded by: Justin Packard (elect)

Personal details
- Party: Republican
- Education: University of Connecticut

Linda McGrath is an American politician. She is a member of the New Hampshire House of Representatives.

She grew up in Connecticut and graduated from the University of Connecticut. She is a pharmacist by profession.
