= Frances McGrath =

American actress

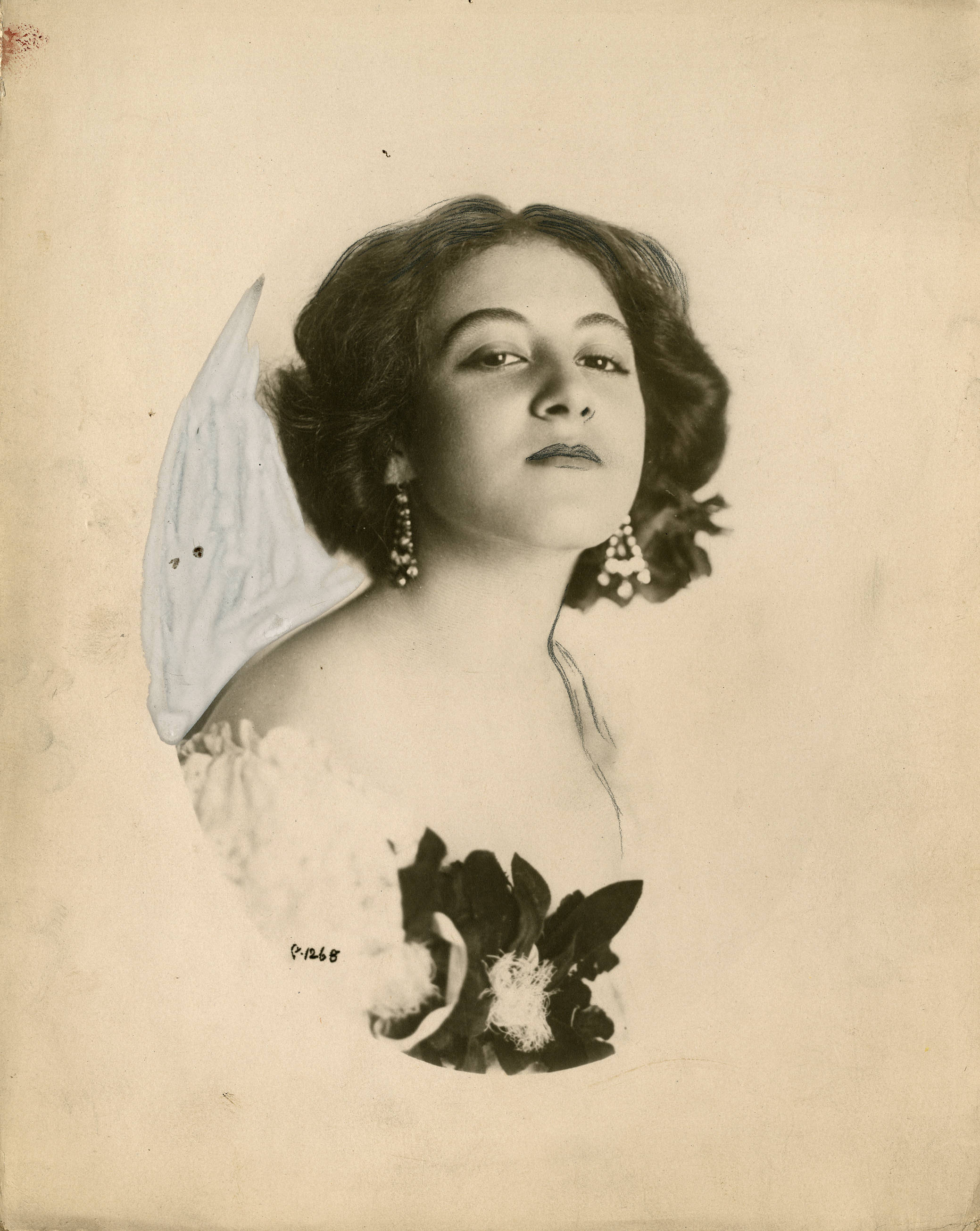
Frances McGrath, around the 1910s.

Frances McGrath (born 1895 or 1896) was an American actress.

== Early years ==
McGrath first appeared on stage when she was 3 1/2 years old. Her parents were friends with some of the actors presenting The Country Editor, and the actors asked that McGrath be allowed to play a child's role. By age 5, she played a dual role in East Lynne, and from age 6 to 10 she had a child's role in The Peddler. After that, she lived in a convent for four years.

== Career ==
When McGrath was 14, she performed with Henry Miller in For a Woman, after which she had the juvenile female lead in Getting a Polish with May Irwin. Following that, she joined a stock company in Union Hill, New Jersey, as its ingenue. In 1918, McGrath became the leading lady of the Auditorium Players in Baltimore. She performed at the Grand Opera House in Paterson, the Gaiety Theater in Hoboken, the American Theatre in Philadelphia, and the Garrick Theatre in New York before she joined the Grand Opera House Players in Brooklyn, New York as their ingenue in 1915.

By April 1921, McGrath headed the Frances McGrath Resident Players at the Lyceum Theatre in Paterson, New Jersey. In May 1922, she returned to act with the Blaney Players at the Yorkville Theater in New York. The trade publication The Billboard described the public's response as having "the appearance of a small-sized tho friendly riot to get into the playhouse". She went on to perform with the Fulton Players in Brooklyn.

On Broadway, McGrath appeared in The Governor's Boss (1914), portrayed Florence Gordon in Two Strangers From Nowhere (1924), and portrayed Josephine Gilbert in Tired Business Man (1929).

== Personal life ==
McGrath was married to Forrest Orr, and they had a son, Forrest Orr Jr.

According to an article from The New York Times in 1927, McGrath broke two vertebrae after she fell out of a window in front of her home during a nightmare.
