= Magrath baronets =

Extinct nobility title in Ireland

The Magrath Baronetcy, of Allevolan in the County of Tipperary, was a title in the Baronetage of Ireland. It was created on 5 June 1629 for John Magrath. The title became extinct on the death of the third Baronet in circa 1670.

== Magrath baronets, of Allevolan (1629) ==
- Sir John Magrath, 1st Baronet (died c. 1652)
- Sir Terence Magrath, 2nd Baronet (died c. 1660)
- Sir John Magrath, 3rd Baronet (died c. 1670)
