= S&P Global =

American financial services company

S&P Global Inc.

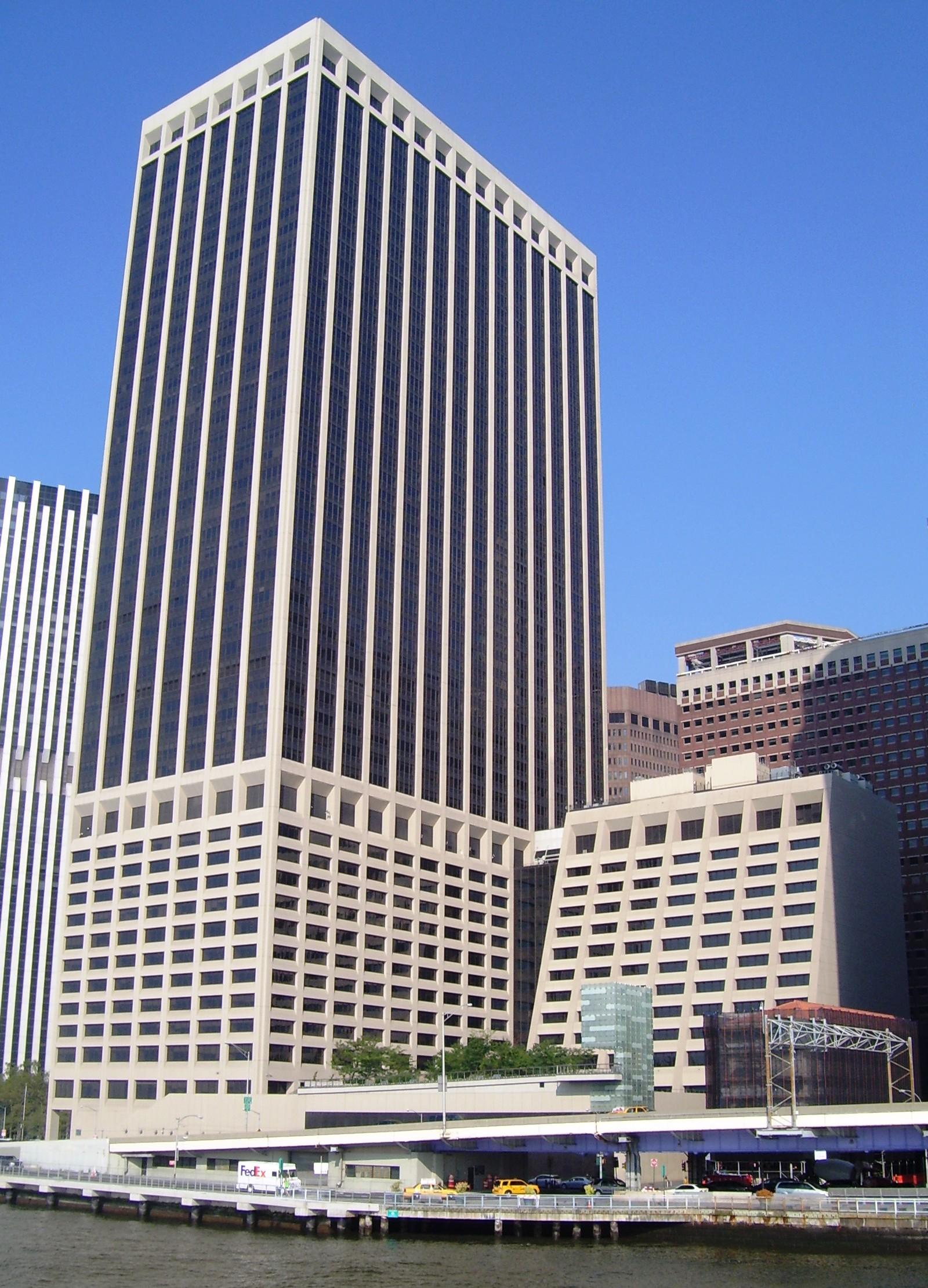
- Headquarters at 55 Water Street
- Formerly: McGraw–Hill, Inc. (1964–1995); The McGraw–Hill Companies, Inc. (1995–2013); McGraw Hill Financial, Inc. (2013–2016)
- Type: Public
- Traded as: NYSE: SPGI; S&P 500 component
- Industry: Financial services
- Predecessor: The McGraw–Hill Book/Publishing Companies (formerly 'The McGraw Publishing Company' and 'The Hill Book Company')
- Founded: 1917; 109 years ago
- Founders: James H. McGraw; John A. Hill
- Headquarters: 55 Water Street, New York City, New York, U.S.
- Area served: Worldwide
- Key people: Martina Cheung (president & CEO)
- Products: Financial information and analytics
- Revenue: ▲US$15.3 billion (2025)
- Net income: ▲US$4.47 billion (2025)
- Total assets: ▲US$61.2 billion (2025)
- Total equity: ▼US$31.1 billion (2025)
- Number of employees: 42,350 (2024)
- Subsidiaries: S&P Global Ratings; S&P Global Energy; CRISIL; S&P Dow Jones Indices; S&P Global Market Intelligence; S&P Global Sustainable1; Kensho Technologies
- Website: www.spglobal.com/en

S&P Global Inc. (prior to 2016, McGraw Hill Financial, Inc., and prior to 2013, The McGraw–Hill Companies, Inc.) is an American publicly traded corporation headquartered in Manhattan, New York. Its primary areas of business are financial information, analytics, and energy and commodities intelligence. It is the parent company of S&P Global Ratings, S&P Global Energy, S&P Global Market Intelligence, and the Indian credit rating agency CRISIL. It is also the majority owner of the S&P Dow Jones Indices joint venture. "S&P" is a shortening of "Standard and Poor's."

== History ==
=== 19th century ===
The predecessor companies of S&P Global have histories dating to 1888, when James H. McGraw purchased the American Journal of Railway Appliances. He continued to add further publications, eventually establishing The McGraw Publishing Company in 1899.

=== 20th century ===
John A. Hill had also produced several technical and trade publications and in 1902 formed his own business, The Hill Publishing Company. In 1909, both men, having known each other's interests, agreed upon an alliance and combined the book departments of their publishing companies into The McGraw–Hill Book Company. John Hill served as president, with James McGraw as vice-president. In 1917, the remaining parts of each business were merged into The McGraw–Hill Publishing Company.

In 1964, after Hill died, both McGraw–Hill Publishing Company and McGraw–Hill Book Company merged into McGraw–Hill, Inc. McGraw–Hill purchased credit rating agency Standard & Poor's from Paul Talbot Babson in 1966. In 1979, McGraw–Hill acquired Byte magazine from its owner/publisher Virginia Williamson, who then became a vice-president of McGraw–Hill. In 1986, McGraw–Hill bought out competitor The Economy Company, then the United States' largest publisher of educational material. The buyout made McGraw–Hill the largest educational publisher in the United States.

In 1994, McGraw–Hill's broadcasting division signed a deal with ABC, due partly to the fact that its stations in San Diego (KGTV) and Indianapolis (WRTV) had already been aligned with the network, and that Denver (KMGH-TV) and Bakersfield (KERO-TV) joined the ABC family (Bakersfield sister station KERO-TV was also involved in the deal between McGraw–Hill and ABC; however, that station had to wait for its affiliation contract with CBS to expire in March 1996, before it could finally switch to ABC).

=== 21st century ===
In 2009, McGraw Hill sold Business Week to Bloomberg.

In October 2011, McGraw–Hill announced it was selling its entire television station group to the E. W. Scripps Company for $212 million. The sale was completed in December 2011. It had been involved in broadcasting since 1972, when it purchased four television stations from a division of Time Inc. The sale included McGraw–Hill Broadcasting's stations KERO-TV and KZKC-LP Bakersfield; KGTV and KZSD-LP San Diego; KZCS-LP Colorado Springs; flagship station KMGH-TV and KZCO-LD Denver; KZFC-LP Fort Collins; and WRTV Indianapolis.

In November 2012, McGraw–Hill announced it was selling its entire education division, known as McGraw–Hill Education to Apollo Global Management for $2.5 billion. In March 2013, McGraw–Hill announced it had completed the sale for $2.4 billion cash. In May 2013, shareholders of McGraw–Hill voted to change the company's name to McGraw Hill Financial.

In September 2014, McGraw–Hill divested the subsidiary McGraw–Hill Construction to Symphony Technology Group for US$320 million. The sale included Engineering News-Record, Architectural Record, Dodge and Sweet's. McGraw–Hill Construction has been renamed Dodge Data & Analytics.

In February 2016, McGraw–Hill announced that McGraw–Hill Financial would change its name to S&P Global Inc. by the end of April 2016. McGraw Hill Financial officially changed its name following a shareholder vote on April 27, 2016. In April 2016, McGraw–Hill announced that it was selling J.D. Power and Associates to investment firm XIO Group for $1.1 billion.

In November 2020, S&P Global agreed to acquire IHS Markit analytics company in a $44 billion transaction. In 2023, S&P sold the former IHS engineering operations to KKR & Co., which rebranded as Accuris.

In October 2025, S&P Global announced a deal to buy markets data and analytics firm With Intelligence for $1.8 billion.

On July 1, 2026, S&P Global completed the spin-off of its Mobility division into an independent publicly traded company, Mobility Global Inc.

== Corporate organization ==
S&P Global organizes its businesses into divisions, based on the market in which they are involved:

=== S&P Global Ratings ===
S&P Global Ratings provides independent investment research including ratings on various investment instruments.

=== S&P Global Energy ===
Headquartered in London, S&P Global Energy, formerly Platts, is a provider of information and a source of benchmark price assessments for the commodities, energy, petrochemicals, metals, and agriculture markets. It has offices in more than 15 cities, including major energy centres such as London, Tokyo, Dubai, Singapore, and Houston, and international business centres such as São Paulo, Shanghai, and New York City.

=== S&P Dow Jones Indices ===
Launched in July 2012, S&P Dow Jones Indices is the world's largest global resource for index-based concepts, data, and research. It produces the S&P 500 and the Dow Jones Industrial Average.

S&P Dow Jones Indices calculates over 830,000 indices, publishes benchmarks that provide the basis for 575 ETFs globally with $387 billion in assets invested, and $1.5 trillion of the world's indexed assets.

=== S&P Global Market Intelligence ===
S&P Global Market Intelligence is a provider of multi-asset class and real-time data, research, news and analytics to institutional investors, investment and commercial banks, insurance companies, investment advisors and wealth managers, corporations, and universities. Subsidiaries and brands include Capital IQ, EViews, Journal of Commerce, Panjiva, and Global Insight.

==== Compustat ====
Compustat, also known as S&P Compustat, is a database of financial, statistical, and market information on active and inactive global companies throughout the world. The service was launched by Standard & Poor's (now S&P Global Ratings) in 1962. This database provides products directed at institutional investors, universities, bankers, advisors, analysts, and asset/portfolio managers in corporate, M&A, private capital, equity, and fixed income markets. The database covers 99,000 global securities, covering 99% of the world's total market capitalization with annual company data history available back to 1950 and quarterly data available back to 1962 (depending when that company was added to the database).

== Presidents ==
- James H. McGraw (1917–1928)
- Malcolm Muir (1928–1937)
- James H. McGraw Jr. (1937–1950)
- Curtis W. McGraw (1950–1953)
- Donald C. McGraw (1953–1968)
- Shelton Fisher (1968–1974)
- Harold McGraw Jr. (1974–1983)
- Joseph Dionne (1983–1998)
- Harold W. McGraw III (1998–2013)
- Douglas L. Peterson (2013–2024)
- Martina Cheung (2024–present)

== Acquisitions ==
During the course of its history, McGraw Hill and from 2016, S&P Global has expanded significantly through acquisition, not just within the publishing industry but also into other areas such as financial services (the purchase of Standard & Poor's in 1966) and broadcasting (the 1972 acquisition of Time-Life Broadcasting). The publishing and education assets are a part of McGraw–Hill Education from the company separation in 2013:

Date of acquisition	Asset acquired	Industry
1920	Newton Falls Paper Company	-
1928	A.W. Shaw Company	Publisher of magazines and textbooks
1950s	Gregg Company	Publisher of vocational textbooks
1953	Companies of Warren C. Platts, including Platts	Publisher of petroleum industry information
1954	Blakiston, from Doubleday	Publisher of medical textbooks
1961	F.W. Dodge Corporation	Publisher of construction industry information
1965	California Test Bureau	Developer of educational testing systems
1966	Standard & Poor's	Financial Services
1966	Shepard's Citations	Legal publisher
1968	National Radio Institute	Correspondence School
1970	The Ryerson Press	Educational and trade publishing
1972	Television Stations of Time Life Broadcasting	Broadcasting
1979	Data Resources Inc.	Economic data, models and consulting
1986	The Economy Company	Educational publishing
1988	Random House Schools and Colleges	Educational publishing
1988	CQI ComStock	Financial Services
1993	Macmillan/McGraw–Hill School Publishing Company	Educational publishing
1996	Times Mirror Higher Education	Educational publishing
1997	Micropal Group Limited	Financial Services
1999	Appleton & Lange	Publisher of medical information
2000	Tribune Education, including NTC/Contemporary	Publisher of supplementary educational materials
2001	Mayfield Publishing Company	Publisher of humanities and social science textbooks
2004	Capital IQ	Company information aggregation
2005	J.D. Power & Associates	Marketing information provider
2015	SNL Financial	Financial News
2018	Kensho Technologies	Artificial Intelligence
2019	451 Research	Global IT research and advisory
2022	IHS Markit	Information Provider
2022	The Climate Service	Information Provider
2023	ChartIQ	Charting Provider
2023	Tradenet	Vessel-Tracking Platform
2023	TruSight Solutions LLC	Third-party Risk Assessments
2023	Market Scan Information Systems, Inc	Automotive Data Provider
2024	Visible Alpha	Consensus Estimates Data
2024	World Hydrogen Leaders	Hydrogen Information Provider
2025	With Intelligence	Private markets data and intelligence provider

This list only includes acquisitions made by McGraw–Hill, not its subsidiaries. McGraw–Hill typically does not release financial information regarding its acquisitions or divestitures.

== Divestitures ==
After acquiring a portfolio of diverse companies, McGraw Hill later divested itself of many units to form McGraw Hill Financial which is now S&P Global:

Date of divestiture	Asset relinquished	Industry
1996	Shepard's legal publisher to Times Mirror	Publishing
2009	Vista Resources to Guidepoint Global	Expert Networks
2011	Television station group to the E. W. Scripps Company	Broadcasting
2013	McGraw–Hill Education to Apollo Global Management	Publishing
2013	Aviation Week to Penton	Publishing
2014	McGraw–Hill Construction to Symphony Technology Group	Publishing
2016	J.D. Power & Associates to XIO Group	Marketing information provider
2016	Equity Research Group to CFRA	Equity research
July 1, 2026	S&P Global Mobility, spun off as Mobility Global Inc.	Automotive data and analytics

This list only includes divestitures made by S&P Global, not its subsidiaries.

== McGraw–Hill Building ==
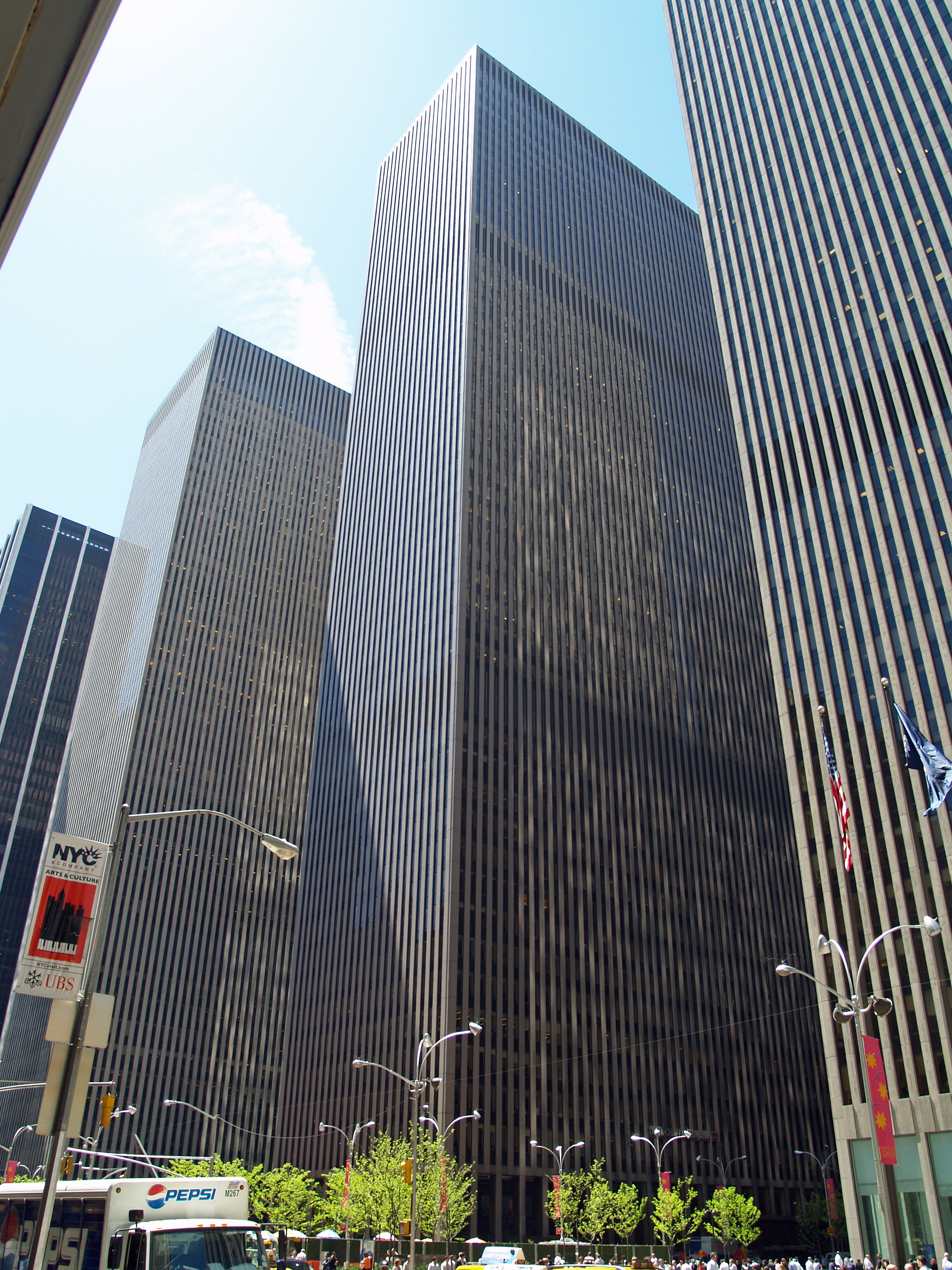
1221 Avenue of the Americas, former McGraw–Hill headquarters

The company was based at 1221 Avenue of the Americas until July 2015. The predecessor company McGraw Hill Inc. had been based at 330 West 42nd Street and both have been known as The McGraw–Hill Building, a name originally used for a prior headquarters at 469 Tenth Avenue.

== Connection to the family of George W. Bush ==
The McGraws and the George W. Bush family have close ties dating back several generations. Harold McGraw Jr. (deceased) was a member of the national grant advisory and founding board of the Barbara Bush Foundation for Family Literacy.

== McGraw–Hill Federal Credit Union ==
Established in 1935, the McGraw–Hill Federal Credit Union originally served employees of the McGraw–Hill companies in New York City only. The credit union moved from its location inside the McGraw–Hill building to East Windsor, New Jersey, in 2005. Its accounts are insured by the National Credit Union Administration. It provides savings, checking accounts, CDs, money-market accounts, IRAs, credit cards, auto loans, and home mortgages. In February 2019, the credit union announced plans to merge with Pentagon Federal Credit Union, completing to convert customers to those of PenFed on May 1, 2019.

== Awards ==
In 1999, the National Building Museum presented the McGraw–Hill Companies with its annual Honor Award for the corporation's contributions to the built environment.

In 2023, S&P Global was recognized in Newsweek's ranking of America's Greenest Companies 2024 for its commitment to sustainability.
