= James H. McGraw =

American businessman (1860–1948)

- Born: 17 Dec 1860; Harmony, New York, US
- Died: 21 February 1948 (aged 87); San Francisco, California, US
- Children: Curtis McGraw, Donald Cushing McGraw

James Herbert McGraw (December 17, 1860 in Harmony, New York – February 21, 1948) was co-founder of what is now McGraw-Hill Education. He was the president of McGraw-Hill from 1917 to 1928. The McGraw Publishing Company and the Hill Publishing Company merged their book departments in 1908

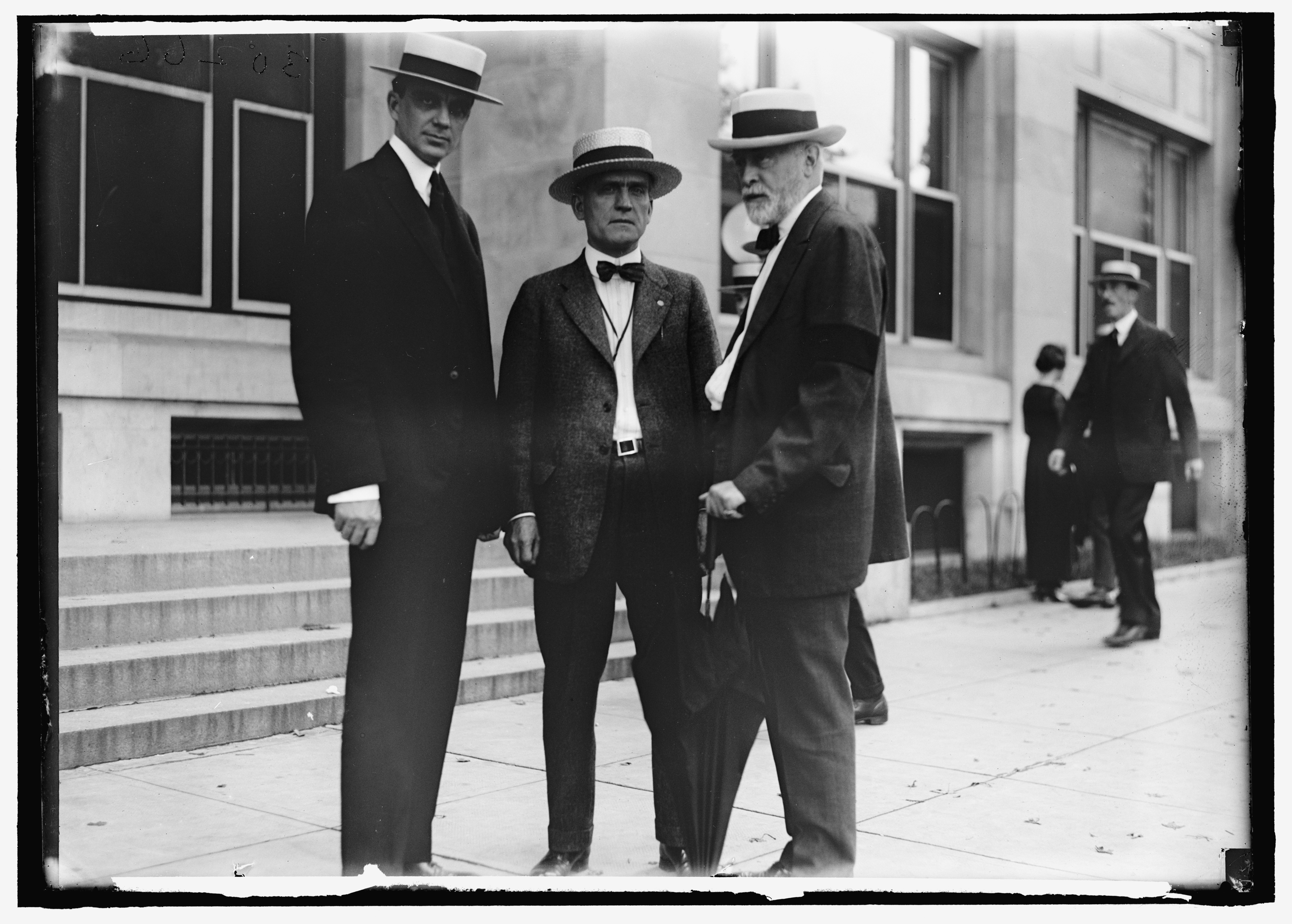
McGraw (on the right)

== McGraw Publishing Company ==
In his early life, James McGraw attended the State Normal School at Fredonia, New York, (later SUNY Fredonia), working as a schoolteacher after graduation. He purchased the American Journal of Railway Appliances in 1888, and eleven years later established The McGraw Publishing Company. Originally specializing in technical publications, the company merged with the Hill Publishing Company in 1917 and expanded into textbooks for high schools and colleges.

== Personal life ==
James McGraw was father of Curtis McGraw and Donald Cushing McGraw, each of whom later served as president of McGraw-Hill.

== See also ==
- McGraw Hill Education
- S&P Global, formerly known as McGraw-Hill Financial
