= Seán mac Ruaidhri Mac Craith =

Irish historian

Seán mac Ruaidhri Mac Craith (fl. 14th-century) was an Irish historian known as the author of Caithréim Thoirdhealbhaigh.

== Biography ==
The Meic Craith of Thomond were a learned family who had close ties to Clare Abbey, an Augustinian foundation. They were historians and poets attached to the Uí Bhriain kings and earls of Thomond. Another family of the name, not known to be related, were natives of Termon McGrath, Lough Erne.

Magrath's Caithréim Thoirdhealbhaigh is an account of the wars fought between two branches of the Uí Bhriain kings in the 13th and 14th century, ending with their successful defeat of the Anglo-Normans at the Battle of Dysert O'Dea in 1318, which kept Thomond free of English influence for over two hundred years.

It is also notable for one of the earliest references to the Banshee in Irish literature.

Modern editions of the Caithréim are based on two surviving sources - Royal Irish Academy Ms 23 Q 16, a large fragment on vellum written in 1509; and Trinity College Dublin H. 1. 18 (no. 1292) Ms, written by Aindrias Mac Cruitín for Tadhg Mac Conmara in 1721.

== See also ==
- Mac Craith
- Battle of Dysert O'Dea
