= Harold McGraw III =

American businessman (born 1948)

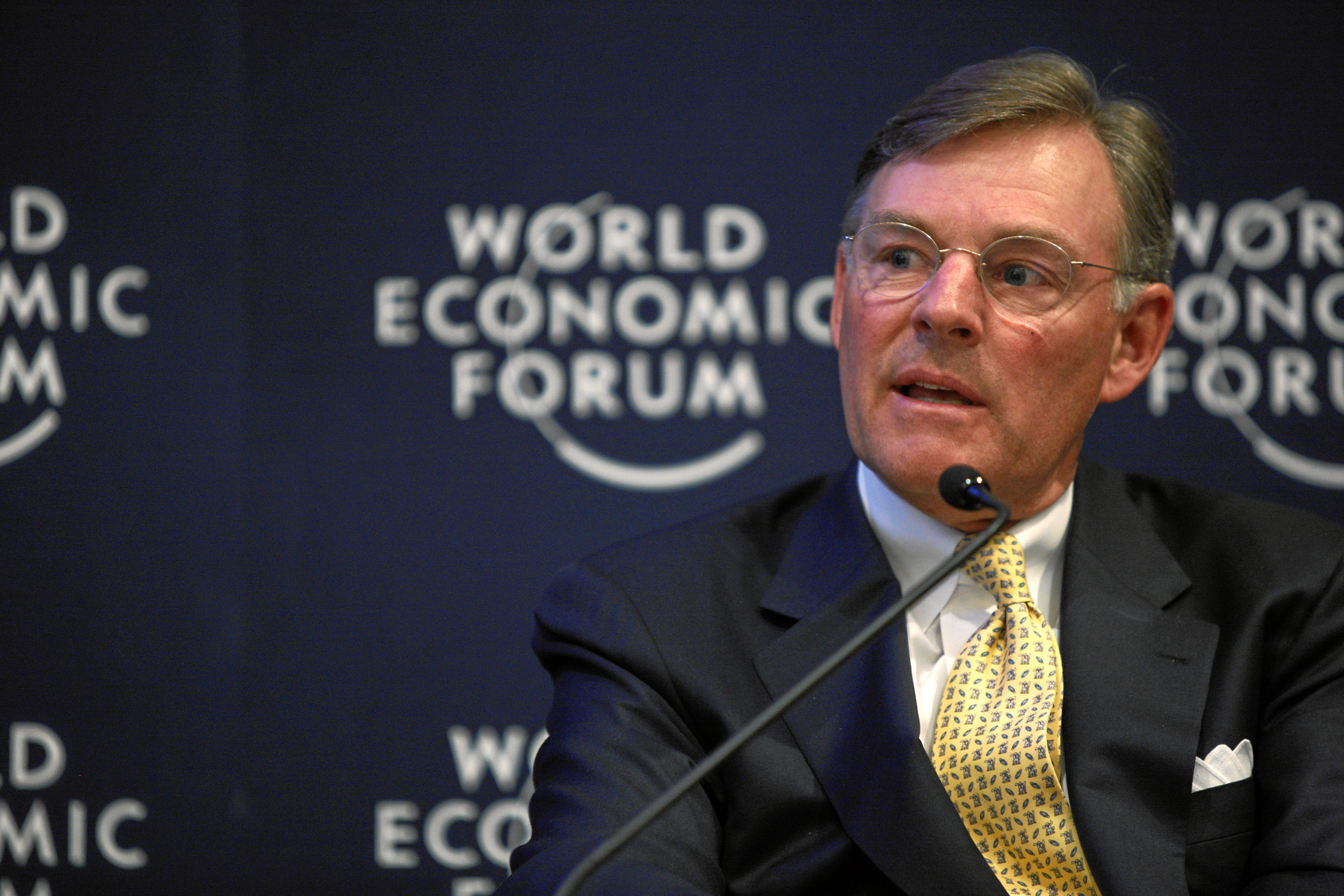
McGraw at the World Economic Forum Annual Meeting, 2011.

Harold Whittlesey "Terry" McGraw III (born August 30, 1948) is an American businessman and is the chairman emeritus of McGraw Hill Financial (now S&P Global and formerly McGraw-Hill Companies).

He was chief executive officer of the company from 1998 through 2013, and was president from 1993 to 2013 and chairman from 2000 to 2015. He was the Chairman of the International Chamber of Commerce and very active on trade issues on the world stage. He has been Chairman of the Business Roundtable, an association of CEOs of American companies.

== Biography ==
McGraw attended Salisbury School for his high school years. McGraw received an M.B.A. from the Wharton School at the University of Pennsylvania in 1976 and a B.A. from Tufts University in 1972.

=== McGraw-Hill ===
McGraw was elected president and chief operating officer of McGraw-Hill in 1993, CEO in 1998, and chairman in December 1999. He was a member of the corporation's board of directors from 1987 to 2015.

As CEO, he led the consolidation of 15 diverse units into three business segments, each a market leader.

McGraw joined The McGraw-Hill Companies in 1980 and was vice president, Corporate Planning; publisher, Aviation Week & Space Technology; president, McGraw-Hill Publications Company; and president, McGraw-Hill Financial Services Company. While CEO of McGraw-Hill in 2009, McGraw earned a total compensation of $5,905,317, which included a base salary of $1,390,500, a cash bonus of $1,261,000, stock granted of $924,060, options granted of $1,854,583, and other compensation of $475,174.

In 1999, McGraw and his father Harold McGraw, Jr. accepted the Honor Award from the National Building Museum on behalf of the McGraw-Hill Companies, which were recognized for their contributions to the U.S.'s built environment.

=== Other work ===
McGraw was chairman of the Business Roundtable's International Trade & Investment Task Force from October 2003 through 2006. In that post, he led the task force's efforts to work with CEO groups in other countries and to support free trade agreements. The group makes up more than a third of the total value of the U.S. stock market, 60 percent of total corporate philanthropic donations in the country and almost half of all private research and development funding in the U.S.

McGraw is Chairman of the United States Council for International Business and Chairman of the US President's Advisory Committee for Trade Policy and Negotiations. Previously he also was Chairman of the International Chamber of Commerce. McGraw sits on the steering committee of the China–United States Exchange Foundation.

He is a member of the board of directors of United Technologies and of Phillips 66 and a member of the Business Council. In the past he was a member of President George W. Bush's Transition Advisory Committee on Trade.

McGraw is also chairman of the National Council on Economic Education; co-chair of Carnegie Hall's Corporate Leadership Committee and member of its Board of Trustees; member of the boards of the New York Public Library, National Organization on Disability, National Academy Foundation, Partnership for New York City, National Actors Theater and Prep for Prep.

McGraw is Chairman of the International Chamber of Commerce, Chairman of the United States Council for International Business and Chairman of the US President's Advisory Committee for Trade Policy and Negotiations. He is a member of the board of directors of United Technologies and of Phillips 66 and a member of the Business Council. In the past he served as a member of President George W. Bush's Transition Advisory Committee on Trade.

McGraw was the last Chairman of the now-closed Emergency Committee for American Trade (ECAT).

=== Personal life ===
As of 2006, McGraw lives in Darien, Connecticut.
