= Panjiva =

Global trade data company

Panjiva Inc.
- Type: Subsidiary
- Industry: Data; Technology; SAAS
- Founded: United States (2006)
- Founder: Josh Green, Jim Psota
- Headquarters: New York, NY, United States
- Key people: Josh Green, CEO; Jim Psota, CTO
- Parent: S&P Global
- Website: panjiva.com

Panjiva Inc. is a global trade data company based in New York City. It is a subscription-based website with import and export details on commercial shipments worldwide. Panjiva was founded in 2006 by Josh Green and James Psota and acquired by S&P Global in 2018.

== Business ==
Panjiva organizes and indexes data provided by a number of different third-party sources, primarily Customs agencies, but also commercial information resources like Dun & Bradstreet, ZoomInfo, and Kompass. The Panjiva platform aggregates these different data sources to supply information on companies and other agents engaged in international trade.

At the time of its founding, Panjiva was the first online resource of its kind, designed to provide transparency to international trade. Leveraging its trade data, Panjiva is able to produce details of trends within sectors, and has tools on its website to facilitate the analysis and visualization of global trade flows. Information published by Panjiva has been used by news websites such as FT.com and CNNMoney.com.

Panjiva's customers use the data in a variety of different ways: to search for suppliers or manufacturers overseas, to find new customers for their products or services (such as logistic services), to track competitors' trade activity, and to gain insight into high-level global trade trends.

Jeff Silberman, Chair of the Department of Textile Development and Marketing at New York's Fashion Institute of Technology, has praised Panjiva as "not just innovative, but revolutionary."

Panjiva was acquired in February 2018 by S&P Global.

== Data ==
Panjiva obtains data from several Customs agencies and data partners worldwide, with company-level shipment details for: The United States, China, Mexico, Brazil, Bolivia, Chile, Colombia, Ecuador, Panama, Paraguay, Peru, Uruguay, and Venezuela.

Data for the United States is obtained through the Freedom of Information Act. Data for all sources is obtained legally.

== Founding ==
Panjiva was founded by Josh Green (CEO) and Jim Psota (CTO) in 2006. The idea for the company was born when Green was asked by his work to find a reliable international supplier of a tablet display. After doing some research, he was shocked at how fragmented data about international trade was, and how difficult it was to obtain reliable information on manufacturers or buyers. From there, Green and Psota - friends from graduate school - decided to launch a website that would make it easier to connect international buyers and suppliers.

Since its founding, Panjiva's objective has expanded from being a resource for buyers and suppliers to providing information to all parties engaged or interested in global trade flows.

== Growth ==
Panjiva has grown quickly in the short time since its inception. In 2013, it was named one of America's fastest-growing private companies by Inc. Magazine. As of August 2015, Panjiva has customers in 89 countries and has offices in three cities worldwide.

Panjiva is headquartered in New York, with an engineering office in Boston and an East Asia sales and support office in Shanghai.
