= Cathreim Thoirdhealbhaigh =

Cathreim Thoirdhealbhaigh, or Triumphs of Torlough in English, is a historical account written in the 14th century in Irish by Seán mac Ruaidhrí Mac Craith, the chief historian to the Uí Bhriain dynasty. It depicts the wars between the Irish Uí Bhriain and the English de Clares for control of the Thomond region of Ireland, drawing from contemporary sources for details. Though it has been praised for its accuracy and historical value, it is not a strictly scholarly work: it incorporates verse as well as prose, and includes fantastical elements such as the banshee in the historical events it describes.

== Content ==
=== Historical material ===
Cathreim is written mostly in prose, describing the wars between the Irish and the English in Thomond, now mainly County Clare. The time period spanned by this work stretches from 1194 to 1318. Specific, highly significant events in the work are portrayed in verse. It is split into two volumes: the first volume primarily covers the war between Toirdhealbhach Mór Ó Briain and Thomas de Clare from 1275 to 1285, and the second details the war between Murchad Ó Briain and Richard de Clare, from 1310 to Richard's defeat in the Battle of Dysert O'Dea in 1318. Accompanying these volumes are prefaces that describe the history prior to the main events.

The preface to the first volume discusses the start of the English invasion of Ireland, and the subsequent struggle of the various dynasties to remain independent. The preface to the second volume tells of the establishment of an Irish domain in the English region and its subsequent fragmentation in the years between 1287 and 1310.

=== Mythological material ===
The work is also known for its vivid description of the mythological banshees incorporated into the historical narrative. There are a few specific banshees that are described in the text; all three are portrayed as women, one beautiful—representing the "Sovereignty of Erin", and whose place in folklore faded over time—and one or two that are ugly, representing its despair. The ugly hags, surrounded by mutilated bodies and described in grotesque detail, foretell doom of armies, Irish and Norman alike, to their commanders, who do not heed the warning and press on to their eventual destruction. These tales in Cathreim are the last known stories involving banshees from the Clare area until the Memoires of Lady Fanshawe, published about 300 years later in 1665; despite this, local legends surrounding banshee involvement in the battles of Thomond survived orally to modern times. This depiction of the banshee washing the bodies and armor of the doomed in blood has drawn parallels to the Gaelic tradition of the Washer in the Ford.

== Scholarly study ==
An imperfect copy of Cathreim dating from 1509 has been preserved in the library of the Royal Irish Academy. A newer copy was produced by Aindrias Mac Cruitín in 1721 at the request of Teige Mac Conmara; this copy was held in the library at Trinity College in Dublin. In 1929, a translation of the work into English by Standish Hayes O'Grady was published posthumously by the Irish Texts Society; O'Grady had died in 1915.
