= McGraw Hill =

Educational publisher

- The branded McGraw Hill logo as of 2020
- Status: Public
- Traded as: NYSE: MH
- Founded: 1888; 138 years ago
- Founders: James H. McGraw; John A. Hill
- Country of origin: United States
- Headquarters location: 8787 Orion Place, Columbus, Ohio 43240, US
- Key people: Philip Moyer (CEO); David Cortese; Scott Grillo; Catherine McManus
- Publication types: Adaptive learning technology, educational software, e-books, apps, platform services, curriculum, and books
- Fiction genres: Learning educational values
- Revenue: ▼$2.1 billion (2026)
- No. of employees: 4200 (2025)
- Official website: mheducation.com

McGraw Hill, Inc. is an American education science company that provides educational content, software, and services for students and educators across various levels—from K-12 to higher education and professional settings. It produces textbooks, digital learning tools, and adaptive technology to enhance learning experiences and outcomes. It is one of the "big three" educational publishers along with Houghton Mifflin Harcourt and Pearson Education. McGraw Hill also publishes reference and trade publications for the medical, business, and engineering professions. Formerly a division of The McGraw Hill Companies (later renamed McGraw Hill Financial, now S&P Global), McGraw Hill Education was divested and acquired by Apollo Global Management in March 2013 for $2.4 billion in cash. McGraw Hill was sold in 2021 to Platinum Equity for $4.5 billion. The company is based in Columbus, Ohio. McGraw Hill completed its initial public offering on July 24, 2025, and began trading on the New York Stock Exchange under the ticker symbol MH.

== History ==
McGraw-Hill logo used from 1964 to 1997

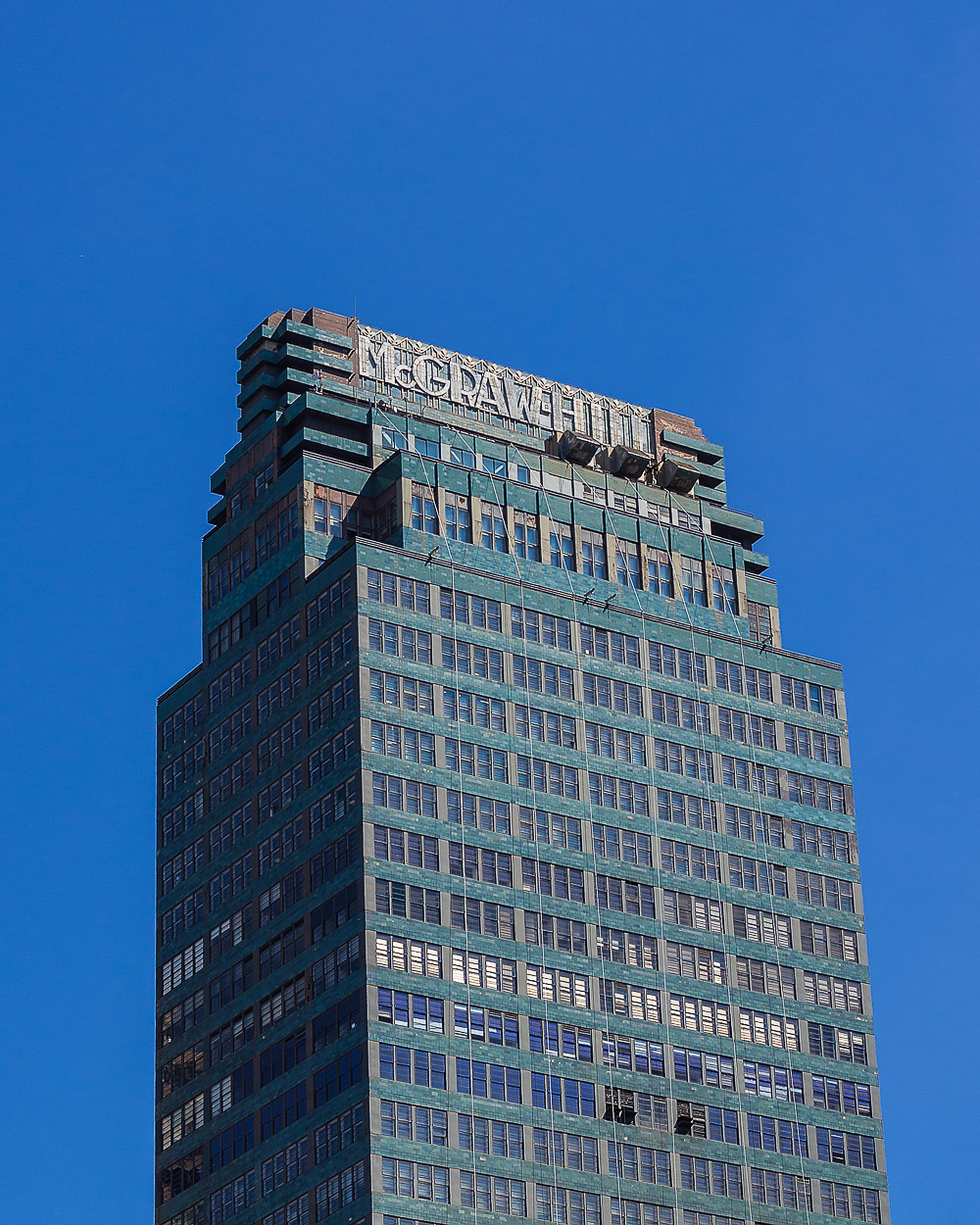
330 West 42nd Street, the former, long-time headquarters of McGraw Hill

=== 19th century ===
McGraw Hill was founded in 1888, when James H. McGraw, co-founder of McGraw Hill, purchased the American Journal of Railway Appliances. He continued to add further publications, eventually establishing The McGraw Publishing Company in 1899.

=== 20th century ===
Co-founder John A. Hill, had also produced several technical and trade publications and in 1902 formed his own business, The Hill Publishing Company.

In 1909, the two co-founders formed an alliance and combined the book departments of their publishing companies into an incorporated company called The McGraw-Hill Book Company. John Hill served as president, with James McGraw as vice-president. The remaining parts of each business were merged into The McGraw-Hill Publishing Company, Inc in 1917.

In 1946, McGraw-Hill founded an international division of the company. It acquired Contemporary Films in 1972 and CRM in 1975. McGraw-Hill combined its films in the CRM division in 1978. McGraw-Hill sold CRM in 1987.

In 1979, McGraw-Hill Publishing Company purchased Byte from its owner/publisher Virginia Williamson, who then became a vice-president of McGraw-Hill. In 1986, McGraw-Hill bought out competitor The Economy Company, then the nation's largest publisher of educational material. The buyout made McGraw-Hill the largest educational publisher in the U.S.

In 1988, Harold McGraw became chairman emeritus of McGraw Hill. In 1988, Random House sold its school and college textbook divisions to McGraw-Hill.

In 1989, McGraw-Hill formed a joint partnership with Robert Maxwell, forming the second largest textbook publisher in the United States.

=== 21st century ===
In 2004, The McGraw-Hill Companies sold its children's publishing unit to School Specialty. In 2007, The McGraw-Hill Companies launched an online student study network, GradeGuru.com. This offering gave McGraw-Hill an opportunity to connect directly with its end users, the students. It allowed students to share notes and materials for cash or gift cards in return. The site closed in April 2012.

==== 2010s ====
On October 3, 2011, Scripps announced it was purchasing all seven television stations owned by The McGraw-Hill Companies' broadcasting division McGraw-Hill Broadcasting for $212 million; the sale is a result of McGraw-Hill's decision to exit the broadcasting industry to focus on its other core properties, including its publishing unit. This deal was approved by the FTC on October 31 and the FCC on November 29. The deal was completed on December 30, 2011.

On November 26, 2012, The McGraw-Hill Companies announced that it was selling its entire education division to Apollo Global Management for $2.5 billion. On March 22, 2013, McGraw Hill Education announced it had completed the sale and the proceeds were for $2.4 billion in cash. In 2012, McGraw Hill acquired Redbird Learning and in 2013, McGraw Hill acquired ALEKS. In 2014, McGraw Hill Education India partnered with GreyCampus to promote Online Learning Courses among University Grants Commission- National eligibility Test Aspirants. In 2014, McGraw Hill acquired Engrade. On June 30, 2015, McGraw-Hill Education announced that Data Recognition Corporation (DRC) had agreed to acquire "key assets" of the CTB/McGraw-Hill assessment business. In 2016, McGraw Hill acquired Everyday Mathematics. In 2017, McGraw Hill acquired My Math.

On May 11, 2017, McGraw-Hill Education announced the sale of the business holdings of McGraw-Hill Ryerson (Ryerson Press) to Canadian educational publisher Nelson. In 2018, McGraw-Hill launches textbook rental program, adding to affordable options available for college students. On January 17, 2019, McGraw Hill Education announced Reveal Math and Inspire Science, new curricula for K–12.

On May 1, 2019, McGraw-Hill Education announced an agreement to merge with Cengage Group. The merged company was expected to retain McGraw Hill as the corporate name. The merger was called off on May 1, 2020. In 2019, McGraw Hill acquired Core-Plus Mathematics Project.

==== 2020s ====
In 2020, McGraw Hill became a distributor for Illustrative Mathematics. In 2021, McGraw Hill acquired Kidaptive.

McGraw Hill was sold in 2021 to Platinum Equity for $4.5 billion.

In November 18, 2025, McGraw Hill announced that it will add GenAI teacher assistants to K-12 programs in order to expand the writing assistance provided to students.

In May 2026, major publishers including McGraw Hill, as well as definitely Elsevier, Cengage, Hachette, and Macmillan, sued Meta Platforms, alleging that Meta used their books and journal articles, without their permission, to train Llama.

== Acquisitions ==
The McGraw Hill Companies expanded significantly through acquisition, including financial services and broadcasting:

Date of acquisition	Company acquired	Industry
1920	Newton Falls Paper Company	Producer of paper
1928	A.W. Shaw Company	Publisher of magazines and textbooks
1950s	Gregg Company	Publisher of vocational textbooks
1953	Companies of Warren C Platts, including Platts	Publisher of petroleum industry information
1954	Blakiston, from Doubleday	Publisher of medical textbooks
1961	F.W. Dodge Corporation	Publisher of construction industry information
1965	California Test Bureau	Developer of educational testing systems
1966	Standard & Poor's	Financial Services
1966	Shepard's Citations	Legal publisher
1968	National Radio Institute	Correspondence School
1970	The Ryerson Press	Educational and trade publishing
1972	Television Stations of Time Life Broadcasting	Broadcasting
1979	Osborne Books	Educational and trade publishing
1986	The Economy Company	Educational publishing
1988	Random House Schools and Colleges	Educational publishing
1993	Macmillan/McGraw-Hill School Publishing Company including Glencoe, SRA, and former Laidlaw publications	Educational publishing
1996	Times Mirror Higher Education including William C Brown, Richard D Irwin, Irwin Professional, Mosby College and Brown & Benchmark	Educational publishing
1997	Micropal Group Limited	Financial Services
1999	Appleton & Lange from Pearson	Publisher of medical information
2000	Tribune Education, including NTC/Contemporary, Everyday Learning/Creative, Instructional Fair, Landoll, The Wright Group. American Education Publishing, Meeks Heit & Peter Bedrick Books	Publisher of supplementary educational materials
2000	Mayfield Publishing Company	Publisher of humanities and social science textbooks
2002	Open University Press	University press – academic publications
2005	J.D. Power & Associates	Marketing information provider
2013	Key Curriculum	Math technology firm
2013	ALEKS	Adaptive learning firm
2014	Area9 Aps	Adaptive learning firm
2014	Engrade	Learning management system
2016	Redbird Advanced Learning, formerly Education Program for Gifted Youth	Adaptive learning firm
2021	Kidaptive	Adaptive learning firm
2021	Triad Interactive	Educational software firm
2021	Achieve3000	Educational software firm
2022	Boards & Beyond	Medical education platform
2025	Essaypop	Educational software firm

== Presidents ==
- John A. Hill (1909–1917)
- James H. McGraw (1917–1928)
- Johnathan Heflin (1928–1948)
- James McGraw Jr. (1948–1950)
- Curtis W. McGraw (1950–1953)
- Donald C. McGraw (1953–1968)
- Shelton Fisher (1968–1974)
- Harold McGraw Jr. (1974–1983)
- Joseph Dionne (1983–1998)
- Harold W. McGraw III (1998–2013)
- Buzz Waterhouse (2013–2014)
- David Levin (2014–2017)
- Buzz Waterhouse (2017–2018)
- Nana Banerjee (2018–2019)
- Simon Allen (2019–2026)
- Philip Moyer (2026-Present)

== Controversies ==
In 1980, McGraw Hill paid the African American writer and civil rights activist James Baldwin a $200,000 advance for his unfinished book Remember This House, a memoir of his personal recollections of civil rights leaders Medgar Evers, Malcolm X and Martin Luther King Jr. Following his death, McGraw Hill sued his estate to recover the advance they had paid him for the unfinished book. The lawsuit was dropped by McGraw Hill in 1990, citing a desire not to cause distress to Baldwin's family.

In October 2015, McGraw-Hill Education was accused of whitewashing history after it published a caption in a geography textbook referring to American slaves as "workers". McGraw Hill issued an apology, updated the digital version of the materials, and offered schools replacement texts at no charge. It has been linked to broader controversies about texts at the Texas Education Agency.

=== Pricing ===
McGraw Hill has been accused of using online access codes included with texts to prevent students from reselling used books. During the COVID-19 pandemic, when many students were studying remotely, McGraw Hill was accused of price gouging, in charging several times more for ebooks than for print texts. In Florida, DeSantis announced the lawsuit accusing McGraw Hill from overcharging to school districts above the lowest price in at least 5900 instances. According to the lawsuit, McGraw Hill and Savvas Learning agreed to lower prices if there was a lower price available in the country, which McGraw Hill did not abide by. Additionally there was one instance of them overcharging by $279,000 for a single book in Osceola County School districts.

== Works ==
Films:

- Maintaining Classroom Discipline (1947)

== See also ==
- Educational publishing companies
- Books in the United States
- Discovery Education
- Google for Education
- Houghton Mifflin Harcourt
- Pearson Education
- S&P Global
- Scholastic Corporation
