= Clan McGrath =

Irish clan

McGrath Mac Craith
- Parent house: Dál gCais
- Country: Ireland
- Founded: Early 11th century
- Current head: By sept Chief
- Titles: Coarbs of Termonmagrath and Protectors of the Priory of Lough Derg 12th - 17th century; Ollamhs and Hereditary Poets to the O'Brien, Princes of Thomond 13th - 16th century

The McGrath (Irish: Mac Raith, commonly now Mac Craith) family is an Irish clan. The name is derived from the Gaelic Mac Craith, recorded in other written texts as Mag Craith, Mag Raith and Macraith, including the Annals of the Four Masters and the Annals of Ulster. McGrath is a surname of ancient Irish origin, and is borne by the descendants of a number of septs, each with a common origin in the Kingdom of Thomond, a kingdom that existed before the Norman invasion and was located in north Munster.

Tradition states the McGraths are of Dál gCais ancestry, stemming from Cormac Cas, King of the Province of Munster in the 3rd century AD. The Irish surname Mac Craith is considered to be patronymic in origin, being a name derived from the first name of the original bearer. The prefix ‘Mac’ in Mac Craith, denotes ‘son of’ and is followed by the genitive form of Rath, a personal name meaning ‘good fortune’, or ‘grace’. The final -c in Mac was subsequently carried across and prefixed to the personal name Rath. According to historian C. Thomas Cairney, the MacGraths were one of the chiefly families of the Dal gCais or Dalcassians who were a tribe of the Erainn who were the second wave of Celts to settle in Ireland between about 500 and 100 BC.

As the native Irish language was replaced by English, so the spelling of the family name Mac Craith was transformed. The most widely used anglicised spelling of Mac Craith is McGrath. However other variants exist, including Magrath, McGraw, Macrae, Mcilrath, MacCrae, McCreagh, MacGraith, Megrath, MacReagh, MacCraw, McCreath, MacGrae, Makrayth, McKray. These are simply anglicised variations of the same name. This name changes on the 14th century to Mongrut when few clan member inmigranted to France

== Brian Boru, High King of Ireland (941 - 1014 AD) ==
During the High Kingship of Brian Bóruma Mac Cennéide or Brian Boru as he is more commonly referred, the Mac Craith Clan as a separate entity did not exist and the ancestors of the Mac Craith possibly formed part of a wider family group.

Historical sources state these proto-Mac Craiths were the descendants of Cinnéide (Kennedy), the Father of Brian Boru, and when Brian died they were within the generational range that made them eligible for the leadership position within the wider Clan group, they were part of the deirbhfhine. This allowed any man whose father, grandfather or great grandfather eligible for election as King. In the lifetime of the king, one man of the deirbhfhine was nominated Tánaiste, or heir, to succeed on the king's death. With the election of one of Brian's sons as King and the passage of time, these proto-Mac Craiths were no longer eligible for leadership of the O'Brien dynasty (descendants of Brian Boru) Clan, and so developed into a separate dynasty.

Brian Boru's Father Cinnéide had the support of the O'Neill dynasty of Ulster in his rise to power. This link may have drawn the Mac Craith Clan north to Ulster to settle the lands around Lough Derg in Tyrone, Fermanagh and Donegal. The Mac Craith Clan established a buffer zone through their control of the Termon (Church) lands around the holy islands of Lough Derg. An area known as Termonmagrath. This buffer zone provided a neutral territory protected by Irish custom and insulated the Uí Néill of Tyrone from the other powerful dynasty in Ulster, the O'Donnell dynasty of Tyrconnell (Co. Donegal).

== Earliest references ==
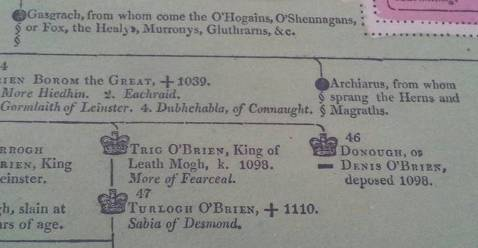
The Royal Lineage of the Clan McGrath

The earliest reference to the name McGrath occurs in a citation from 1086 AD referring to a McGrath who was described as the Chief Poet of the Province of Munster. This McGrath, the progenitor of the Clan Mac Craith, was related to the O’Briens of Thomond and served them as poets. The Mac Craith lineage is as follows:

Lórcan → Cinnéide → Etchtighern (Brother of Brian Boru) → Flan → Craith.

Craith may have been born around 970 AD. In 1097 AD the Annals of Innisfallen record the "Son of Mac Craith the poet died". This is the first instance of Mac Craith being used as a family name. As poets the Mac Craiths are important enough to be recorded in the Annals.

== McGrath Sept of Ulster - Tearmann Mac Craith ==
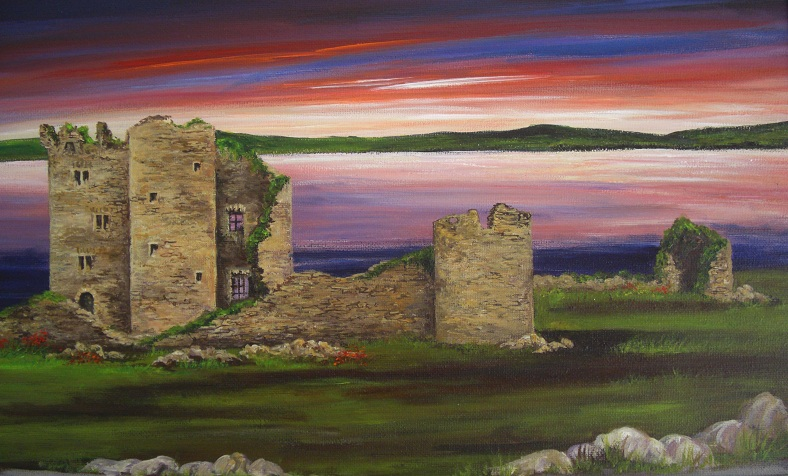
McGrath Castle, Termonmcgrath, Barony of Tyrhugh, Co. Donegal

Termonmagrath (in Gaelic: Tearmann Mac Craith) exists in the Barony of Tirhugh in southern Donegal. The territory incorporates the modern town of Pettigo and the ancient pilgrimage island and lake of Lough Derg. Termonmagrath is also the location of Castle McGrath (also known as Termon Castle). To the north of the McGrath territory and just outside Ballybofey is Carraig McGrath, possibly the inauguration site of the McGrath Chieftains.

The Clan McGrath were the hereditary Coarbs of the famous pilgrimage island known as St. Patrick's Purgatory on Lough Derg. They were also protectors of the Augustinian monastic settlement on Saint's Island, Lough Derg and provided many Prior's of the pilgrimage site in the medieval period. The Clan McGrath controlled the routes to the pilgrimage islands and the revenues gained from pilgrims making their way from across Europe. The Annals of Ulster detail the names and lineage of the McGrath Chieftains of Ulster from the 12th century until the eventual dispossession of McGrath lands in the 17th century. This valuable source also gives information on the Termon.

The Termon was under the divine protection of the local Saint Davog (Dabhog) and the McGrath Chieftain. We find the annals describing this Termon as Tearmann Dabhog (St. Davog's Termon) until the end of the 15th century when in 1496 the Annals of Ulster begin to refer to it as Tearmann Mhic Craith (McGrath's Termon) from the Clan who held the hereditary office of Corab (in Gaelic: Comharba).

== Archbishop Miler McGrath 1523 - 1622 AD ==
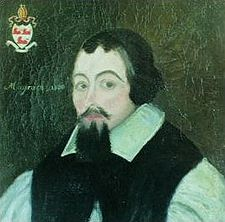
Portrait of Archbishop Miler McGrath (1523–1622)

Perhaps the most infamous of the McGraths of Termonmagrath is Archbishop Miler McGrath (also spelt Myler Magrath 1523–1622 AD). Miler was the son of the McGrath Chief, Donnchadh and was destined for the religious life. He became a Franciscan and studied in Rome where he acquired the Roman Catholic bishopric of Down and Connor. Although kinsman and foster brother of the Gaelic Lord and Chieftain Shane O'Neill, Miler was himself a master in the game of politics and alliances. In 1569 he conformed to the reformed faith and was initially granted the Protestant bishopric of Clogher, thus holding a Roman Catholic and Protestant bishopric at the same time. This continued until 1580 when he was eventually deprived of the Catholic bishopric for heresy.

Miler would expand his influence and power across Ireland and in 1571 AD became Archbishop of Rock of Cashel in Tipperary. Miler brought 200 armed men from his ancestral home at Termonmagrath, consisting mainly of his McGrath kinsmen. Their descendants are still found today in Co. Tipperary. Miler patrolled his lands in Tipperary, carrying a sword and wearing armour, a sign perhaps of the dangers in which a man such as he found himself. Miler married Amy, the daughter of the O'Meara Chieftain and fathered four sons and two daughters.

In 1622 aged 100 years Miler died. Prior to his death he commissioned his tomb stone which today bears an effigy in the robes of a Catholic bishop. It is debated as to whether this is an actual representation of Miler or a later addition to the tomb. It is a tradition that Miler converted back to the Catholic faith before his death. Miler had his coat of arms carved on his tombstone, these are re-created in the above artwork. Miler's arms are the earliest depiction of the McGrath Arms.

== The Ulster McGrath Chiefs of Termonmagrath 13th - 18th century ==
1. Giolla Adhamhnain Mac Craith
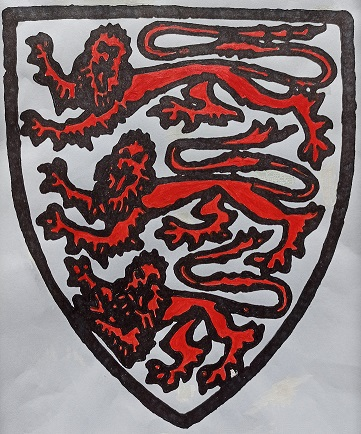
  Coat of Arms of the McGrath of Ulster (circa 16th Century).
2. Nicholas, son of Giolla Mac Craith
3. Muiris son of Nicholas Mac Craith
4. Mark son of Muiris Mac Craith
5. Sean Mor son of Muiris Mac Craith
6. Matthew brother of Sean Mor Mac Craith
7. Sean Bui 'the fair haired' son of Sean Mor Mac Craith
8. Diarmuid son of Mark, son of Muiris Mac Craith
9. Rory son of Diarmuid, son of Mark Mac Craith
10. Torlough, son of Andrew Mac Craith
11. The Mac Craith (First Name Unknown) Chieftain between 1549 and 1562
12. Donncha Mac Craith, Father of Archbishop Miler McGrath
13. James, son of Archbishop Miler McGrath
14. Turlough, son of James McGrath, Captain of 140 rebels in Donegal during the 1641 Rebellion

Late 17th and early 18th century

1. Brian, son of Turlough McGrath, a rebel, is outlawed for his part in the Jacobite wars in Ireland
2. Seámus Og, son of Turlough is McGrath of the Termon
3. Reamonn, son of Seámus Og is McGrath of the Termon

== McGrath Sept of County Tipperary ==
The Civil Survey of 1654 AD for Co. Tipperary effectively groups together three main clusters of McGraths. One are the descendants of Archbishop Miler McGrath and his kinsmen in central Tipperary, the other is a family listed as McCragh in northwest Tipperary and the third was again listed as McCragh in the Cahir area. Members of the Thomond branch of the McGraths migrated to the Cahir area of Tipperary in the late 16th century and established a bardic school.

A McCraith family occupied the tower house at Loughlohery both before and after the Cromwellian transplantation that removed many Irish families from their homesteads. Their descendants still occupy the townland of Loughlohery to this day. Over the subsequent years some of these McCraghs migrated into Co. Limerick, Co. Cork and Co. Waterford.

== McGrath Sept of County Waterford ==
The best known Waterford McGraths, often referred to as McCragh, were located on the eastern slopes of the Knockmealdown Mountains. These families were descended from the Mac Craiths of Thomond and were associated with the Fitzgerald family (Earl of Desmond). The McGraths and O’Briens were invited to occupy the slopes of the Knockmealdown and Commeragh Mountains respectively to protect the Fitzgerald territory from incursion from the North.

The head of the clan in the early 1600s was Philip McCragh of Sliabh Gua who constructed a castle called Sleady Castle in 1628 at Curragh na Sleady. The walls of this impressive 17th century, four story structure are still standing. Sleady Castle is located just east of Cappaquin a little off the road to Clonmel. The family also had a castle at Mountain Castle (which is still standing), where Philip lived prior to building Sleady Castle.

A tower house at Abbeyside across the river from Dungarvan was built by a member of this family in the mid 1500s. They were protectors and patrons of the nearby Augustinian Abbey. The castle was finally demolished in the 1960s. The site of the castle was marked with the unveiling of a commemorative plaque in 2015.

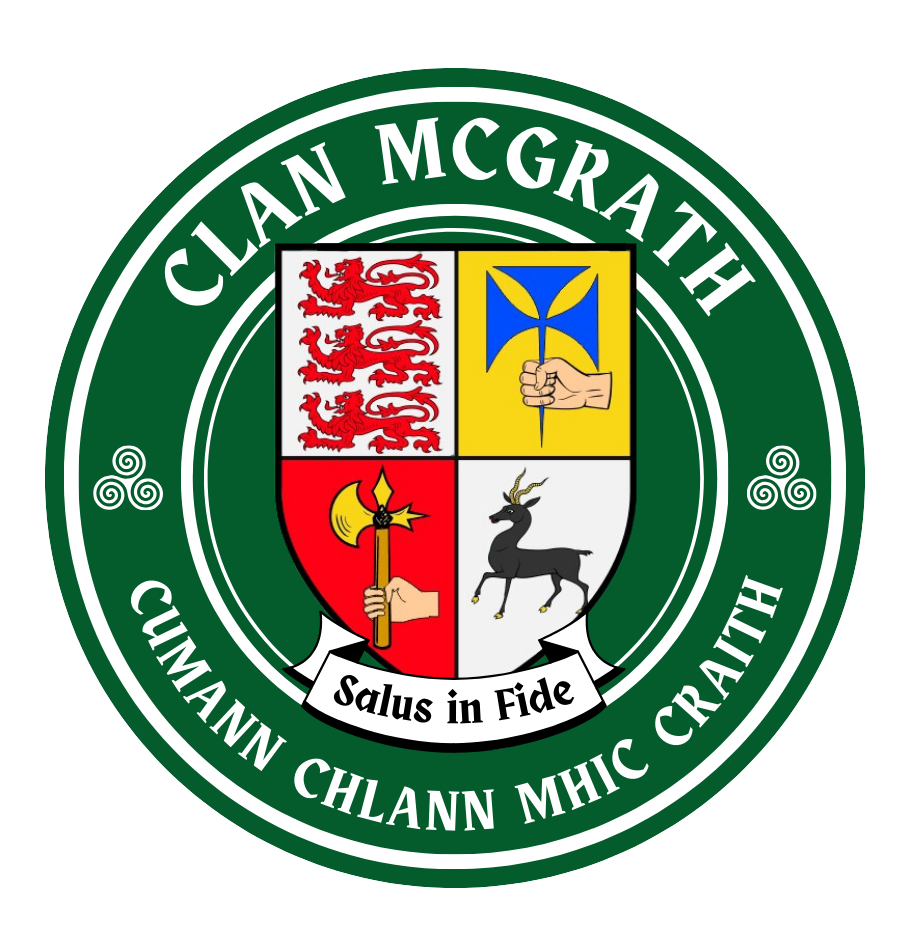
Logo of Cumann Chlann Mhic Craith - The Clann McGrath Society

== Arms ==
The McGrath family are armigerous in Ireland and in the United Kingdom of Great Britain and Northern Ireland. The earliest recorded McGrath Arms are that of the McGrath Chieftain of Ulster. These are recorded as 'argent, three lions passant gules' in the book Irish Pedigrees: The Stem of the Irish Nation by John Hart and in Irish Families, Their Names, Arms and Origins by Edward MacLysaght. However, the McGrath Arms are recorded in a slightly different form in 16th and 17th century sources, including on a portrait of Archbishop Miler McGrath dated 1570. In the portrait the red lions can be seen against a white field on the shield positioned at the top left corner. The lions are passant guardant, that is looking towards the viewer. Above the shield is a bishop's mitre. In 1622, the death of Archbishop Miler McGrath saw him interred in a tomb at the Cathedral Church of St. Patrick at the Rock of Cashel. Above the head of the effigy and on the tomb itself is a carved stone coat of arms. These arms depict three lions passant guardant in the first quarter, the arms of the McGrath Chieftain of Ulster. Miler being a native of the Termonmagrath, the Termon lands of the McGraths of Ulster and son of the McGrath Chieftain, Miler naturally depicts these arms on his coat of arms.

The other quarters include a cross pattee, a motif often used by bishops and bishoprics. A battleaxe, possibly representing defence of the faith and a demi-antelope possibly representing steadfastness. The antelopes horns possibly represent the old and new testaments. The motto is held to be SALUS IN FIDE, salvation by faith. There is no historical evidence for the use of this motto. However, modern tradition associates the motto with the arms and in many ways it sits well with the ecclesiastically influenced coat of arms of an archbishop.

== See also ==
- Irish clans
