= David Gardner =

David Gardner may refer to:

- Dave Gardner (basketball) (born 1964), British former basketball player
- David Gardner (cricketer) (1940–2023), British cricketer
- David Gardner (fiddler) (born 1968), Scottish fiddle performer, teacher, and judge
- Dave Gardner (footballer) (1873–1931), Scottish footballer
- Dave Gardner (ice hockey) (1952–2023), Canadian ice hockey centre
- David Gardner (The Motley Fool) (born 1966), American entrepreneur, co-founder of The Motley Fool
- David Gardner (trade unionist) (died 1913), Scottish trade unionist
- David Gardner, vocalist and guitarist of Engerica
- David Gardner, musician of Thessalonians
- Brother Dave Gardner (1926–1983), American comedian and singer
- David M. Gardner (born 1981), American politician
- David P. Gardner (1933–2024), American university administrator, and professor
- David J. Gardner (born 1983), American expert of technology. Holds home record for most wins in Outsmarted.
- David Gardner, Dean of Timothy Dwight College at Yale University

== See also ==
- David Gardiner (disambiguation)
