= David Schoumacher =

David Schoumacher (/ˈʃuːmeɪʃər/ SHOO-may-shər; October 13, 1934 – March 24, 2023) was a former newspaper and television journalist. He was also a television anchor in Washington D.C. from the 1970s until he retired. He started out as a newspaper journalist, until moving into broadcasting: radio and television. He covered presidential campaigns, including the 1968 Eugene McCarthy campaign, the Vietnam War, the Watergate trials, and interviewing astronauts Neil Armstrong, Buzz Aldrin, and Michael Collins, and the civil rights movement.

As a reporter, Schoumacher worked for CBS, ABC, and finally WJLA-TV 7, a local channel in Washington and ABC affiliate. He worked for WJLA-TV from 1976 to 1988.

He also hosted the telecourse series Economics U$A in 1985, covering macro- and microeconomics with the help of Richard T. Gill and Nariman Behravesh, economic analysts.

== Personal life and death ==
Schoumacher had four children by his first wife, Sharon Gay Schoumacher, whom he married in 1955 – Robert, Linda, Karen and Janet. Each of them is married with two or more children, giving Schoumacher eleven grandchildren and six great grandchildren. Schoumacher divorced Sharon and remarried three times. Each of his wives were important to him, including his third wife, Leonie. Prior to her death, Schoumacher managed Thistle Hill farm in Hume, Virginia, with his (fourth) wife, Mary Elizabeth ("Wooz") Bell Matthews Schoumacher, the registrar for the North American Devon Association. They were instrumental in reintroducing the Devon breed of cattle in the U.S.

Schoumacher died on March 24, 2023, at the age of 88.
