= Donald Marron =

Donald Marron could refer to:

- Donald B. Marron Sr. (1934–2019), American entrepreneur and businessman
- Donald B. Marron Jr., American economist and son of Donald B. Marron Sr.
