= List of former consulting firms =

This is a list of notable former consulting firms.

== Former design and engineering consulting firms ==
- Birdsall Services Group
- Hyder Consulting
- Merz & McLellan
- Parkman Group
- Sinclair Knight Merz

=== Former industrial design firms ===
- Lunar Design

== Former digital and IT consulting firms ==
- American Management Systems
- Cambridge Technology Partners
- American Management Systems
- Computer Sciences Corporation
- Covansys Corporation
- Diamond Management & Technology Consultants
- Hitachi Consulting
- Logica
- MarchFirst
- Mahindra Satyam
- Perot Systems
- Razorfish
- Sapient Consulting
- SapientNitro
- SapientRazorfish
- Scient
- USWeb
- Viant
- Whittman-Hart

=== Former cyber security consulting firms ===
- Mandiant

== Former economics consulting firms ==
- Data Resources
- Wharton Econometric Forecasting Associates

== Former human resource consulting firms ==
- Towers Perrin
- Watson Wyatt Worldwide

== Former management consulting firms ==
- Andersen Consulting
- Arthur Andersen
- Mercer Management Consulting
- Monitor
- Navigant Consulting
- Sweett Group

== Former political consulting firms ==
- Cambridge Analytica

== Former research and analysis firms ==
- Business International Corporation
- CNW Marketing Research
- Compete.com
- Data Resources Inc.
- EcoWin
- Global Business Network
- Micropal
- Research International
- Wharton Econometric Forecasting Associates
- Yankee Group

== Former risk management consulting firms ==
- Towers Watson
