= Economics U$A =

Television series

Economics U$A is a telecourse series covering the subjects of microeconomics and macroeconomics. The original series debuted in 1985 and has been updated several times since then (most recently in 2011). The series was produced by the Educational Film Center in Annandale, Virginia, with funding from the Annenberg-CPB Project (now Annenberg Media) and broadcast on PBS and educational stations.

The series was hosted by David Schoumacher, with the help of economic analysts Richard T. Gill and Nariman Behravesh (Chief Economist and Executive Vice President, Global Insight). The series consist largely of interviews of government officials, economic analysts, and people who have experienced important events for the economy of the United States. Herbert Stein, an economic advisor for the Nixon administration, is one of the many guests interviewed in the series.

== Episode guide ==
- Episode 1 - Resources and Scarcity: What Is Economics All About?
  - Wilderness preservation and WWII productivity show how society allocates and transforms resources.
- Episode 2 - Markets and Prices: Do They Meet Our Needs?
  - Developer William J. Levitt's low-cost housing and Reggie Jackson's contract help explain the powerful forces of supply and demand.
- Episode 3 - U.S. Economic Growth: What Is the Gross National Product?
  - This episode documents the GNP's greatest achievements and failures since its introduction in the 1930s.
  - Guests: Robert R. Nathan, War Production Broad, World War II; Alfred E. Kahn, Economist; John Kendrick, Economist; George Washington University; Gaylord Nelson, Counselor, The Wilderness Society
- Episode 4 - Booms and Busts: What Causes the Business Cycle?
  - America's roller-coaster economy is examined in light of the economic theories of Marx, Schumpeter, Keynes, and Say.
- Episode 5 - John Maynard Keynes: What Did We learn from the Great Depression?
- Episode 6 - Fiscal Policy: Can We Control the Economy?
- Episode 7 - Inflation: How Did the Spiral Begin?
  - Inflation in the 1960s - What caused that spiral and how did inflation get out of control?
  - Guests: Walter Heller, Former Chairman, Council of Economic Advisors; James Duesenberry, Former Member, Council of Economic Advisors
- Episode 8 - The Banking System: Why Must It Be Protected?
  - The S&L crisis is reviewed with a discussion of deposit insurance and the accountability of financial institutions. This program was revised in 1992.
- Episode 9 - The Federal Reserve: Does Money Matter?
- Episode 10 - Stagflation: Why Couldn't We Beat It?
- Episode 11 - Productivity: Can We Get More For Less?
  - Guests: Arthur Laffer, Economist
- Episode 12 - Federal Deficits: Can We Live With Them?
- Episode 13 - Monetary Policy: How Well Does It Work?
- Episode 14 - Stabilization Policy: Are We Still In Control?
- Episode 15 - The Firm: How Can We Keep Costs Down?
  - This program looks at the economic factors behind Coke's secret formula change, Studebaker's demise, and The Asbury Park Press.
- Episode 16 - Supply and Demand: What Sets the Price?
- Episode 17 - Perfect Competition & Inelastic Demand: Can the Farmer Make a Profit?
  - This program presents the inside story of American farming's crises from the 1920s to the present.
- Episode 18 - Economics Efficiency: What Price Controls?
  - Rent control in New York City explains the effect of wage and price controls in a free market economy.
- Episode 19 - Monopoly: Who's In Control?
- Episode 20 - Oligopoly: Whatever Happened to Price Competition?
- Episode 21 - Pollution: How Much Is a Clean Environment Worth?
  - The private and social costs of pollution and the international response to global warming are explored.
- Episode 22 - Labor & Management: How do They Come to Terms?
- Episode 23 - Profits and Interest: Where Is the Best Return?
- Episode 24 - Reducing Poverty: What Have We Done?
- Episode 25 - Economic Growth: Can We Keep Up the Pace?
- Episode 26 - Public Goods and Responsibilities: How Far Should We Go?
- Episode 27 - International Trade: For Whose Benefit?
  - Guests: Robert Crandell, economist, Brookings Institution; Rep. John Dingell, D-Michigan; Sen. William Brock, R-Tennessee; Special Trade Representative, Kay Jennings, Toyota dealer; Anthony Solomon, Deputy Treasury Secretary, Carter administration; Patricia Fernandez Kelly; Steve Knaebel, President, Cummins Engine-Mexico
- Episode 28 - Exchange Rates: What in the World Is a Dollar Worth?
  - Guests: Dr. Edward Bernstein, former Principal Economist, U.S. Treasury Department; Dr. Joan Spero, Senior Vice-President, Corporate Affairs, American Express; Dr. Marina von Neumann Whitman, former economic advisor to President Richard M. Nixon; Martin Feldstein; George F. Baker Professor of Economics, Harvard University; Michael Mussa
