= New York University Marron Institute =

American research institute

The New York University Marron Institute of Urban Management is an interdisciplinary institute focused on applied urban research. Founded in 2013 as the Marron Institute on Cities and the Urban Environment, it was launched with a $40 million gift from Donald B. Marron, a New York University (NYU) trustee, founder of Lightyear Capital, and former chairman and chief executive officer of the brokerage firm Paine Webber. The institute's mission is to conduct applied research and work with cities on major challenges of urban living. The institute is based in Brooklyn, New York City.

Marron's research programs include Civic Analytics; Health, Environment, and Policy; Human Exploitation and Resilience; Litmus; and Urban Expansion. One of Marron's most visible areas of work is its Transportation and Land Use program, led by Eric Goldwyn. The program studies transit infrastructure projects, land-use policy, and related data to examine public policies relating to building, managing, and financing capital projects such as subway expansions, bicycle lanes, and high-speed rail.

Within the Transportation and Land Use program, the Transit Costs Project studies why transit construction costs vary so widely across countries and cities. It has assembled a database covering more than 50 countries and more than 11,000 kilometers of urban rail built since the late 1990s, with the goal of identifying how high-capacity transit can be delivered at lower cost in places such as the United States.

Marron's recent transportation publications include A Better Billion (2026), which proposed extending the New York City Subway system by 41 miles over 40 years, adding 64 stations, and creating the potential for 167,064 housing units near new service. Its How Many People Does It Take To Operate a Train? report, published in 2025) examined train staffing practices. Marron's research on the Northeast Corridor led to its proposal for a new high-speed rail network that would reduce the trip time between New York City and Washington, D.C. that is now three hours, down to less than two.

Marron's transportation research has influenced public policy debates. For example, in 2026, the institute's train-operations research influenced New York Governor Kathy Hochul's decision to veto a bill relating to the state's subway crew-size requirements .
