= WEFA =

WEFA may refer to:

- WEFA-LP, a low-power radio station (92.5 FM) licensed to serve Ocala, Florida, United States
- Wharton Econometric Forecasting Associates
