= David Gardiner =

David Gardiner may refer to:

- David Gardiner (footballer) (born 1957), Guatemalan footballer
- David Gardiner (politician) (1784–1844), state senator and father-in-law of U.S. President John Tyler
- David Gardiner (environmentalist) (born 1955), American environmental strategist
- David Gardiner (Home and Away), fictional Australian television character
- David Gardiner (1636–1689), first child born to English settlers in Connecticut, son of Lion Gardiner

== See also ==
- David Gardner (disambiguation)
