= Nariman Behravesh =

American economist

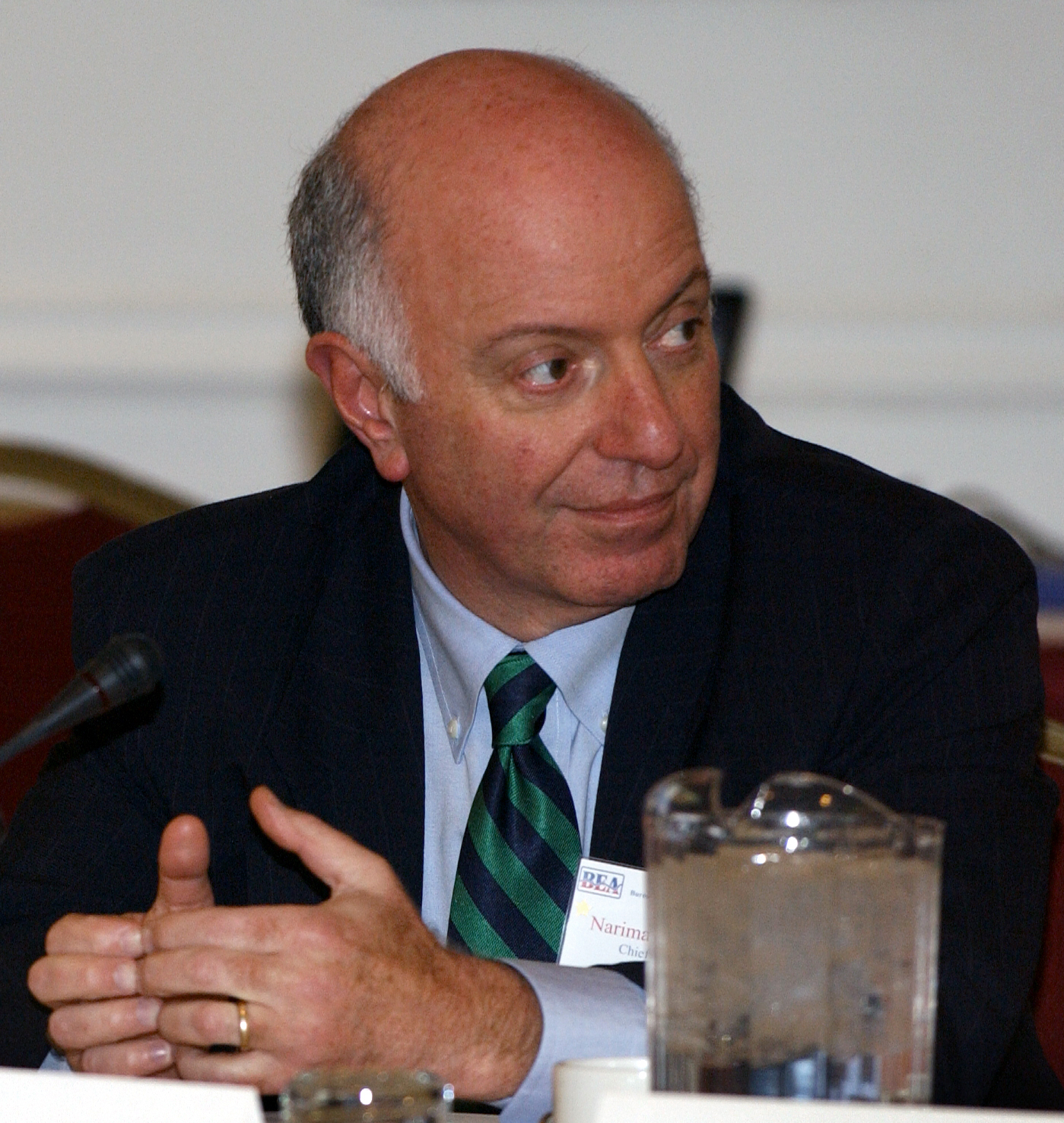
- Born: Iran
- Education: Massachusetts Institute of Technology (BS); University of Pennsylvania (Phd)
- Occupations: Author, adviser, chief economist
- Employer: IHS Markit
- Website: LinkedIn page Twitter page

Nariman Behravesh (Note: Persian: نریمان بهروش, romanized: Narīmān Bihravish) is Chief Economist at the consulting firm IHS Markit, and author of Spin-Free Economics: A No-Nonsense, Nonpartisan Guide to Today's Global Economic Debates (McGraw Hill).

Directing the economic forecasting process at IHS Markit, Behravesh is responsible for developing the economic outlook and risk analysis for the United States, Europe, Japan, China, and other emerging markets. He oversees the work of over 400 professionals located in North America, Europe, Asia, Latin America, the Middle East, and Africa who cover economic, financial, and political developments in 200 countries.

Behravesh is quoted in the media on such topics as the outlook for the US and global economies, exchange rates, the budget deficit, the trade deficit, globalization, country risk, and sovereign debt crises.

== Early life ==
A native of Iran and the son of an Iranian father and an English mother, Behravesh grew up in the Middle East and Europe and is fluent in Italian, French, Persian, and Turkish. He obtained his BS from the Massachusetts Institute of Technology, and earned his master's and Ph.D. in economics at the University of Pennsylvania in 1978, studying with Nobel Prize winner and econometrics pioneer Lawrence Klein, founder of WEFA (Wharton Econometric Forecasting Associates).

Behravesh and his wife, Ann, an attorney, live in Lexington, Massachusetts, and have three children and two grandchildren.

== Career ==
Behravesh serves as the Chief Economist at IHS Inc. Before joining IHS, he was Chief Economist and Executive Vice President of Global Insight, Inc. (now an IHS company). Prior to that, he was Chief International Economist for Standard & Poor's.

He also held a number of other positions, including president and CEO of Oxford Economics U.S.A. and Group Senior Vice President of WEFA. Early in his career, Behravesh worked as a principal analyst at the Congressional Budget Office and as a senior economist at the Philadelphia Federal Reserve. He has been covering the global economy for over 40 years.

Behravesh has been a featured speaker at global conferences, including IHS Cambridge Energy Research Associates CERA Week and the World Economic Forum in Davos.

In 2018 he was honored with the Lawrence R. Klein Award from Arizona State University's W. P. Carey School of Business. Economics professor Dennis Hoffman said that Behravesh "had the most accurate projections of all the Blue Chip contributors for inflation and unemployment over the entire period, and was consistently solid on GDP. His average forecast error was remarkably low, among the best we have seen in the 30-plus years of the award."

== Media appearances ==
Behravesh appears on national radio and television programs, including BBC World Business Report, NBC Nightly News, CNN Headline News, The NewsHour with Jim Lehrer (PBS), Your World with Neil Cavuto (Fox News), CNBC's Closing Bell, Bloomberg TV's World Financial Report, and All Things Considered on National Public Radio. He is cited in business publications such as The Wall Street Journal, The New York Times, The Financial Times, USA Today, Investor's Business Daily, Business Week, Newsweek, Fortune, Forbes, and U.S. News & World Report. Behravesh was the host of the PBS television series, "Inside the Global Economy".

== Honors ==
Behravesh is a "Bloomberg Best", and ranked as one of Bloomberg's Top 10 economists in 2009 and 2010. MarketWatch named IHS Global Insight "Forecaster of the Year" in 2009, and bestowed the company several Forecaster of the Month accolades since. He and his team ranked first on the 2004 USA Today ranking of economic forecasters, and on Reuters' 2004 survey of major currency exchange rate forecasters. In 2008, he was ranked #2 by USA Today. On The Wall Street Journal's annual ranking of US forecasters, Behravesh was ranked #3 (out of 56) for 2006, and he was the only forecaster to place in the top six for 2003, 2004, and 2006.

== Publications ==
Behravesh is the author of Spin-Free Economics: A No-Nonsense, Nonpartisan Guide to Today's Global Economic Debates (McGraw Hill). He has authored articles in European Affairs and Credit Week, co-authored two books -Economics U$A and Microcomputers, Corporate Planning and Decision Support Systems, and was a contributing author to a book on scenario analysis, entitled Learning From the Future. His op-ed pieces have appeared in the Financial Times, Newsweek International, London Times, and the Boston Globe.

== See also ==
- Economics U$A
