= Albert Eckstein =

German pediatrician (1891 - 1950)

- Born: February 9, 1891; Ulm, Germany
- Died: July 18, 1950 (aged 59); Hamburg, Germany
- Burial place: Cambridge, England
- Citizenship: Weimar Republic; Turkey
- Education: University of Freiburg; University Hospital of Düsseldorf; Ankara University; Hamburg University
- Occupation: Pediatrician
- Known for: Maternal and child care in Turkey
- Spouse: Erna Eckstein (1895-1998)
- Children: Klaus Eckstein; Herbert Eckstein; Peter Eckstein
- Relatives: Hugo Eckstein (brother); Otto Eckstein (nephew)
- Awards: Iron Cross, 1st Class

Albert Eckstein (9 February 1891 – 18 July 1950) was a German pediatrician who in exile had worked towards improving maternal and child care in Turkey. Born in Ulm in 1891, Eckstein initially worked as a physician at the University Hospital of Düsseldorf from 1920 until 1935, while also becoming head of pediatrics department there in 1925, after working as an assistant doctor at the University of Freiburg for ten years following WWI. Later in 1935 he moved to Turkey to escape Nazi persecution, where he went on two tours one in 1937 and other in 1938 to report on problems and demographics in Anatolian villages. It was during these trips that he had worked on reducing malaria and noma in villages by finding treatments such as sulfonamide and establishing health clinics throughout Turkey. The number of cases for malaria had been reduced and for noma, it completely died out with the last recorded case being in 1978.

After WWII, he founded the pediatrics department in Ankara University which he also led from 1945 to 1948. His proposal in 1948 for establishing a 300 bed children's hospital in Ankara was rejected which led him to resign from his post on November 1948 and return to Germany. He came back for one last lecture in Ankara University on 27 December 1949. On 18 July 1950, he died in Hamburg in presence of his family and is laid to rest in Cambridge, England.

== Early life and education ==
Born in a Jewish family in Ulm, Albert was the second son after Hugo in the Eckstein family who were factory owners. Hugo's son Otto Eckstein was a notable German-American economist in the 20th century. Going against his father's wishes, Albert had begun studying medicine in Freiburg at the age of 21. After serving as a medical officer in WWI, he worked as an assistant doctor at the Institute of Physiology and Anatomy at the University of Freiburg for ten years.

In 1920, he moved to the Children's Hospital (now University Hospital) in Düsseldorf to work under pediatrician Carl T. Noeggerath. Here he had researched on childhood encephalitis. Having habilitated to senior lecturer and physician in 1923, he later married Erna Eckstein (née Schlossmann), the daughter of Arthur Schlossmann in 1925. In the same year, he was promoted to a full time professor in the Children's Hospital. Erna at the time worked in Auguste-Viktoria children's home and was also involved in social hygiene. After Arthur's death, Eckstein was promoted to the head of pediatrics department at the hospital where he continued to research in infectious diseases such as tuberculosis and smallpox.

Due to the Nuremberg laws introduced in Nazi Germany in 1935, Arthur was targeted for being a Jew which led him to emigrate to Turkey with his family. Through the Emergency Organization for German Scientists Abroad, he received and accepted an offer from the Turkish government, and it was signed by the then Turkish ambassador in Germany, Hamdi Arpağ. He was recommended by German academicians including Philipp Schwartz, then in Switzerland who had started the Emergency Organization and others such as Max Meyer, August Laquer and E. M. Alsleben who resided in Turkey.

== Pediatric work in Turkey ==
The day after him and his family arrived in Ankara on September 1935, Eckstein was asked to investigate the causes of rising child and maternal mortality in Turkey, particularly in the Anatolia region. Additionally he was tasked on collecting the data for women fertility and number of surviving children. For these tasks the official contact who met Eckstein was the Minister of Health and Social Assistance and also the ex-Turkish PM, Refik Saydam. With his assistant, Selahattin Tekand, Eckstein journeyed 13 provinces in the Anatolian region in July–August 1937.

=== 1937 report on Anatolian villages ===
Life in Yozgat, 1937

At the end of the trip, Eckstein had submitted his report that had details under its headings: Results Obtained, Fish Consumption, Nutritional Situation, Fight against Trachoma and Diarrhea, Skin Diseases, Fertility of Mothers and Child Mortality, Child Mortality, Villages and the Poorer Classes in Ankara. In total, Eckstein and Tekand had visited 60 villages with a total population of 52,662 people. Villages visited each ranged from a population of just 100 to ones over 5000. Also the villages visited were varied in wealth, land fertility, altitude as some were on Black Sea and others to be near the Mediterranean Sea. Meeting every child, woman and elder, the doctors were met with openness as they received family details when the villagers were intrigued with the statistical method of data collection at that time. This led to Eckstein also collecting data on cereals, fruit and vegetables, animal husbandry, and literacy levels, among else. To reduce errors in data collection, they employed the use of age ranges to avoid error on the part of villagers if they inaccurately provide ages of their children.

The most important data was on maternal fertility and child deaths for which they took information from 8000 women and their children.

Anatolian Birth and Childhood Mortality Statistics
Age	Number of births	Deceased children	Surviving children
18–24	209.5	40.9	168.6
25–29	332.7	89.6	243.1
30–34	440.2	134.9	305.3
35–39	545.3	176.2	369.1
40–44	604.9	211.5	393.4
45 and above	686.8	309.7	377.1

Isparta, 1938

For child mortality, the deaths of children belonging to women between ages 18–24 were considered to be more accurate than the same for women between ages 40–44 as the latter's children would have been adults while considering the average age of marriage in Turkey at that time was 14. Taking this observation into account, the mortality rate was lower in the Anatolian villages and not of concern which was so earlier perceived by the Turkish government.

At the time, surviving rate of children per woman globally was 3.4 which was lower than the same for Anatolian women aged 35–39 with 3.6 and even for women aged 45 and over with 3.7. The educated population in the villages meanwhile had 2.5 surviving children per women. These results show that the overall population in Turkey was increasing as the rural population made 80 percent of the total population at that time.

=== 1938 report on Anatolian villages ===
Next, the ministry of health and social assistance had tasked Eckstein with collecting common demographic data on Turkish households during July–August 1938 in these provinces—Isparta, Burdur, Antalya, Denizli, Muğla, Aydın, İzmir, Manisa, Balıkesir, Bursa, Kocaeli and Bolu. He had accompanied his wife and pediatric assistant, Dr. Tekand. Their collected data on the villages in Isparta province is shown below:

Anatolian village data in Isparta
Village	Km	Household	Population	Women	Malaria	Enteritis	Other diseases	Cleanliness	School	Water sources
KüçükFindas	20	35	170	45	No	Yes	Rickets	Very clean	No	Bad
BüyükFindas	25	200	1100	287	No	Absolutely	Rickets	Average	Yes	Good
Atabey Eğridir	28	700	3000	297	Yes	Absolutely	Ezcema	Unclean	Yes	Good
YeşilAda	40	150	500	146	No	No	Syphilis	Average	No	Burdur lake
SeniçBey	20	30	250	35	No	No	None	Very clean	No	Fountains
Kelinç	20	30	250	35	Yes	Yes	Rheumatism	Average	Yes	Fountains
Senir	20	30	250	35	No	Yes	Measles	Average	Yes	Fountains
Baladiz	22	60	300	90	Yes	No	None	Very clean	Yes	Fountains
Çünür	5	160	600	127	No	Yes	None	Very clean	Yes	Bad

=== Impact on villages ===
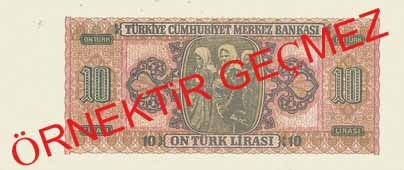
10 Turkish lira banknote in 1942

Later Eckstein with his newfound assistant, Ihsan Doğramacı had travelled around villages to build health clinics to reduce the childhood mortality and increase the maternity fertility rates as Eckstein had concluded to Doğramacı in their first meeting that one-thirds of infants under a year old die early in Turkey. He took numerous photographs in his travels around Turkey which were published by the University of Cambridge. One of the photos had been printed in Turkish pavilion at the world's fair at New York in 1939 and another in 10 lira banknote in 1942.

He also had a knowledge of the Turkish language that led him to publish books on Turkish pediatrics in 1941 and 1947. He had contributed to the study and treatment research on Noma (stomatitis ulcerosa) for which he had worked on a sulfonamide treatment. With these efforts, Noma had been effectively eradicated from Turkey, with the last case seen in 1978.

Noma case statistics
Serial treatment	Distribution rate (in %)	Mortality rate (in %)
No treatment	9.3	100
Neosalvarsan	3.0	88.9
Antigangrene serum	25.5	31.9
Combined serum with sulfonamide	22.2	25.4
Combine serum with irgaphane	27.5	16.9
Penicillin	5.3	12.5

Eckstein's statistics on malaria in Anatolian villages had a major impact in reducing its presence for the future. He was a major proponent of preventive medicine as he had advocated for breastfeeding to be better than bottle feeding for infants.

=== Post-WWII years ===
In the post war period, Eckstein in 1945 had founded the pediatrics department at Ankara University where he held the post as its head for the next three years. In 1948, he had proposed to open a children's hospital in Ankara for treating patients with orthopaedic problems, tuberculosis, malaria and other diseases. When this was rejected, he had made his decision to leave Turkey and had written a long letter to the dean of Ankara medical faculty in November 1948 to submit his resignation. Thereafter the children's hospital was built by Bahtiyar Demirağ and later expanded to 300 beds by Eckstein's former assistant, Ihsan Doğramacı. Today it is known as Hacettepe University Medical School which is situated at Ankara.

Due to his work in Turkey, he had received offers for professorship from multiple German universities including Dusseldorf University children's hospital as pediatric chair. Accepting the Hamburg offer, Eckstein and his wife returned to Germany where he was appointed as a professor at the University of Hamburg that was earlier approved by the Hamburg city senate on 21 March 1948. He took this decision for him and his family to be more closer to their three sons (Klaus, Herbert and Peter) who at the time were studying in England. Coming back once, he had delivered his last lecture in Turkey on 27 December 1949 at the Ankara University faculty of medicine and left the next day for Germany.

== Death ==
On 18 July 1950 in Hamburg, when Eckstein and his family were returning after having a picnic together, he didn't feel well. Nausea, vomiting and other signs of poisoning was noticed. Later admitted to the hospital, he had passed on the same day. Autopsy reports suggest that he had a tumor in his brain. Eckstein's best friend, Erich Romiger had delivered the farewell speech at his funeral. His ashes are laid at Cambridge.

== Memberships held ==
- Member of the publication board of Annals in Pediatrics from 1938 to 1939.
- Chaired the first Turkish Pediatric Congress in 1938.

== Legacy ==
His work had reduced the onset of infectious diseases such as tuberculosis, malaria and noma which had been completely eradicated from Turkey in the 1970s. A rising number of pediatric clinics from the same faculty of medicine which Eckstein started, had been built in different provinces of Turkey. The Turkish Pediatric Congress first chaired by Eckstein in 1938 and later established by Doğramacı as Turkish National Pediatric Society (TNPS) in 1958, is still held to this day with over 66 national pediatric congresses and 100 regional meetings held before. Eckstein's foundational work on pediatrics had modernized Turkish healthcare by influencing doctors working there to carry the same dedicated work. One of them is the Turkish pediatrician and geneticist Burhan Say.

His son Herbert Eckstein, a member of the Royal College of Surgeons of England had established the pediatric surgery department at the children's hospital in Hacettepe University in 1958. This was the first pediatric surgery department established in Turkey and had treated bladder stones other than orthopaedic problems in children.

== Selected works ==
- Encephalitis im Kindesalter (in German transl. Encephalitis in Childhood) / A. Eckstein (1929)
- Eckstein, Albert, Haldun Tekiner, and Necdet Özlem. Çocuk: neşvünema, tegaddî ve metabolizmasının fiziyoloji ve patolojisi (in Turkish transl. The Child: The Physiology and Pathology of Growth, Nutrition, and Metabolism) Receb Ulusoğlu Basımevi, 1941
- Über die Therapie der Sommerdurchfälle mit Sulfonamiden (in German transl. On the Treatment of Summer Diarrhea with Sulfonamides) / von A. Eckstein (1944)
- Eckstein, A. (1946). Malaria im Kindesalter. (in German transl. Malaria in Childhood). Karger.
- Türkiye'de çocuk hastaliklari ve çucuklarin korunmasi problemleri (in Turkish transl. Childhood Diseases and Issues Regarding the Protection of Children in Türkiye) / Albert Eckstein. Almancadan Türkçeye çeviren: Necdet Özlem, 1947
- Noeggerath, C., & Eckstein, A. (1925). Die Urogenitalerkrankungen der Kinder: Störungen und Erkrankungen der Harnbereitung und der Geschlechtssphäre sowie ihrer Organe. (in German transl. Urogenital Diseases in Children: Disorders and Diseases of Urine Formation and the Genital Sphere, as well as their Organs)

== See also ==
- Emigration of Jews from Nazi Germany and German-occupied Europe
