= Michael Wachter =

American law and economist (1943-2022)

- Born: 12 March 1943; New York City, USA
- Died: 3 September 2022 (aged 79); Philadelphia, Pennsylvania, USA
- Title: William B. and Mary Barb Johnson Professor of Law and Economics; Co-Director of the Institute for Law & Economics

Academic background
- Education: Cornell University (B.S. 1964); Harvard University (M.A. 1967, Ph.D. 1970)
- Thesis: Relative Wage Determination Among Industries : Some Theoretical and Empirical Results (1970)
- Doctoral advisor: John Thomas Dunlop; Otto Eckstein

Academic work
- Institutions: University of Pennsylvania Law School

Michael Lawrence Wachter (12 March 1943 – 3 September 2022) is the William B. and Mary Barb Johnson Professor of Law and Economics Emeritus at the University of Pennsylvania Law School, and Co-Director of the Institute for Law & Economics.

== Biography ==
Wachter was born in New York City, and earned a B.S. from Cornell University in 1964, an M.A. from Harvard University in 1967, and a Ph.D. from Harvard University in 1970. From 1964 to 1965 he was a Woodrow Wilson Fellow.

Since 1970, Wachter has held full professor positions at the University of Pennsylvania in Arts and Sciences, the Wharton School, and the University of Pennsylvania Law School. He was Commissioner of the Minimum Wage Study Commission established by the US Congress from 1978 to 1981. He was Interim Provost of the University of Pennsylvania from January 1998 to December 1998. In July 2020, the Michael L. Wachter Distinguished Fellowship in Law and Policy was established in his name at the University of Pennsylvania Law School.

Wachter is the William B. and Mary Barb Johnson Professor of Law and Economics at the University of Pennsylvania Law School, and Co-Director of the Institute for Law & Economics.

Among the many articles Wachter has authored are "The Rise and Decline of Unions," 30 REG. 23 (2007), "Labor Unions: A Corporatist Institution in a Competitive World," 155 U. PA. L. REV. 581 (2007), and "Judging Unions' Future Using a Historical Perspective: The Public Policy Choice Between Competition and Unionization," 2 J. LAB. RES. 339 (2003).

He died on September 3, 2022.
