= Otto Eckstein =

German-American economist (1927–1984)

- Born: August 1, 1927; Ulm, Germany
- Died: March 22, 1984 (aged 56); Lexington, Massachusetts, USA
- Known for: Theory of core inflation
- Children: 3
- Relatives: Albert Eckstein (uncle)

Academic background
- Education: Princeton University; Harvard University
- Thesis: Water-Resource Development: The Economics of Project Evaluation (1955)
- Doctoral advisor: Arthur Smithies

Academic work
- Institutions: Data Resources Inc; Harvard University
- Doctoral students: Lester Thurow; Michael Wachter

Otto Eckstein (August 1, 1927 – March 22, 1984) was a German-American economist and educator. He was a key developer and proponent of the theory of core inflation, which proposed that in determining accurate metrics of long run inflation, the transitory price changes of items subject to volatile pricing, such as food and energy, are to be excluded from computation.

== Education and career ==
Eckstein was born in Ulm, Germany in 1927 to a Jewish family. His father, Hugo Eckstein is a businessman and the brother of the pediatrician Albert Eckstein. In 1938, when Otto Eckstein was 11 years old, he and several other family members fled the Nazi regime, first emigrating to England, and then, a year later, moving to the United States, where he made his permanent home. He studied at the Stuyvesant High School in New York City, where he graduated in 1946. He became a naturalized citizen in the United States in 1945. After one year's military service, Eckstein enrolled at Princeton University in 1947 and he received an A.B. in economics in 1951. He went on to obtain an M.A. and a Ph.D. in economics from Harvard University in 1952 and 1955, respectively. His PhD thesis, titled Water-Resource Development: The Economics of Project Evaluation, was later published as a book by the Harvard University Press in 1958.

After receiving his Ph.D., Eckstein became an instructor in economics at Harvard University in 1955. In 1957, he became an assistant professor in the same department. He was promoted to an associate professor in 1960 and a full professor in 1963 at Harvard University. Eckstein is an economic consultant to President Lyndon Baines Johnson in 1964, and a member of the President's Council of Economic Advisers from 1964 to 1966. In 1969, he and Donald Marron co-founded Data Resources Inc., the largest non-governmental distributor of economic data in the world, which built and maintained the largest macroeconometric model of the era.

In 1969, Eckstein was elected as a Fellow of the Econometric Society. In 1975, he was elected as a Fellow of the American Statistical Association. In 1979 he sold DRI for over $100 million to McGraw Hill.

== Personal life ==
Eckstein was married to Harriett Mirkin in 1954. They had three children. He died of cancer in 1984, at the age of 56. Eckstein's brother Bernard Eckstein (1923-2017) was a chemist who worked in the industry.

== Bibliography ==
=== Books & chapters ===
- Eckstein, Otto. (1958). Water-resource development: the economics of project evaluation. Harvard economic studies. Vol. 104. Cambridge: Harvard University Press.
- Krutilla, John V.; Eckstein, Otto (1961). Multiple Purpose River Development: Studies in Applied Economic Analysis. Johns Hopkins Press. ISBN 978-0-598-12050-2.
- Eckstein, Otto; Brinner, Roger Evan (1972). The Inflation Process in the United States. U.S. Government Printing Office.
- Eckstein, Otto (1973). Public Finance. Prentice-Hall. ISBN 978-0-13-737460-1.
- Eckstein, Otto (1976). Parameters and Policies in the U.S. Economy. North-Holland Publishing Company. ISBN 978-0-7204-9902-5.
- Eckstein, Otto (1978). The Great Recession, with a Postscript on Stagflation. North-Holland Publishing Company. ISBN 978-0-444-85204-5.
- Eckstein, Otto (1981). Core Inflation. Prentice-Hall. ISBN 978-0-13-172635-2.
- Eckstein, Otto (1983). Inflation: Prospects and Remedies. Bloomsbury Academic. ISBN 978-0-944237-07-6.
- Eckstein, Otto (1983). The DRI Model of the U.S. Economy. McGraw-Hill. ISBN 978-0-07-018972-0.
- Eckstein, Otto; Allen Sinai (1990), "1. The Mechanisms of the Business Cycle in the Postwar Period", in Robert J. Gordon (ed.), The American Business Cycle: Continuity and Change, University of Chicago Press, ISBN 978-0-226-30453-3

=== Journals ===
- Eckstein, Otto (1957). "Investment Criteria for Economic Development and the Theory of Intertemporal Welfare Economics". The Quarterly Journal of Economics. 71 (1): 56. doi:10.2307/1882296.
- "Inflation, the Wage-Price Spiral and Economic Growth", 1958, in Relationship of Prices to Economic Stability and Growth
- "Staff Report on Employment, Growth and Price Levels," 1959.
- Eckstein, Otto (1960). "The Problem of Higher College Tuition". The Review of Economics and Statistics. 42 (3): 61–72. doi:10.2307/1926142. ISSN 0034-6535.
- "A Simulation of the U.S. Economy in Recession", with J. S. Duesenberry and G. Fromm, 1960, Econometrica
- "The Determination of Money Wages in American Industry", with T. Wilson, 1962, QJE
- Eckstein, Otto; Fromm, Gary (1968). "The Price Equation". The American Economic Review. 58 (5): 1159–1183. ISSN 0002-8282.
- Feldstein, Martin; Eckstein, Otto (1970). "The Fundamental Determinants of the Interest Rates". The Review of Economics and Statistics. 52 (4): 363–375. doi:10.2307/1926313. ISSN 0034-6535.
- "Industry Price Equations", with D. Wyss, 1972, in Eckstein, editor, Econometrics of Price Determination
- "The Data Resources Model: Uses, structure, and the analysis of the US economy", with E.W. Green and A. Sinai, 1974, in Klein and Burmeister, editors, Econometric Model Performance
- "Econometric Models and the Formation of Business Expectations", 1976, Challenge
- "National Economic Information Systems for Developed Countries", 1977, in Perlman, editor, Organization and Retrieval of Economic Knowledge
- "Long-Term Properties of the Price-Wage Mechanism in the United States, 1891 to 1977", with J. Girola, 1978, REStat
- "Econometric Models for Forecasting and Policy Analysis: The present state of the art", 1981, in Kmenta, editor "Large-Scale Macroeconometric Models"
