= Timothy Dwight College =

Residential college at Yale University

- Residential college at Yale University
- Yale University
- Coat of arms of Timothy Dwight College
- Location: 345 Temple Street
- Coordinates: 41.31054°N 72.92332°W
- Nickname: TD
- Motto: Forsan et haec olim meminisse juvabit. (Latin)
- Motto in English: Someday, perhaps, it will be pleasant to remember even these things.
- Established: 1935
- Named for: Timothy Dwight IV and Timothy Dwight V
- Colors: Red, silver
- Sister college: Leverett House, Harvard
- Head: Michal Beth Dinkler
- Dean: David Gardner
- Undergraduates: 399 (2013-2014)
- Mascot: Red Lions
- Website: timothydwight.yalecollege.yale.edu

Timothy Dwight College, commonly abbreviated and referred to as "TD", is a residential college at Yale University named after two presidents of Yale, Timothy Dwight IV and his grandson, Timothy Dwight V. The college was designed in 1935 by James Gamble Rogers in the Federal-style architecture popular during the elder Timothy Dwight's presidency and was most recently renovated in 2002. In 2021, TD won its Yale-leading 14th Tyng Cup, the championship prize for Yale's year-long intramural athletic competition among the fourteen residential colleges. The current head of college is Michal Beth Dinkler and the current dean is David Gardner.

== History ==
Timothy Dwight College courtyard

Timothy Dwight College, Yale's ninth residential college, opened on September 23, 1935 at an over-budget cost of $2,000,000. At the time, the Yale Alumni Weekly called it "one of the most architecturally pleasing colleges." It was the farthest college from Old Campus until the opening in 2017 of Franklin and Murray colleges several blocks to the north. The design of the college was meant to reference an early 19th-century New England town hall, and the college's brick work with white trim, green shutters, and hand-hewn dining hall beams are all of Federal inspiration. In the college's inaugural year, a number of plaster ceilings collapsed in the college, leading the TD Social Activities Committee to sponsor a Plaster Dinner and Mr. Plaster dances, a tradition that continued until the 1970s.

Under the Yale College policy that let incoming students express a residential college preference, Timothy Dwight developed a reputation for attracting engineers until the policy ended with the class of 1958.

The students of Timothy Dwight were originally nicknamed "Prexies," a slang term for the college's presidential namesakes, but TD's current mascot is the Lion. The college's official motto, appearing on the college crest, is a quotation from the Aeneid (I, 203), when Aeneas seeks to comfort his men as they embark upon an arduous journey to Italy: Forsan et haec olim meminisse juvabit. This is traditionally translated approximately to, "Someday, perhaps, it will be pleasant to remember even this."

The college's popular but unofficial motto is "Àshe," which means "the power to make things happen" in Yoruba, is the college's "war cry" in intramural competitions. Àshe was brought into usage by the former Master, Robert Thompson, known to students as "Master T."

The Timothy Dwight fight song, often sung en masse at The Game, is: "Ring the bell, ring the bell! God damn, fuck, hell! Horseshit, assbite! Nobody's better than Timothy Dwight!"

Timothy Dwight has a sister college at Harvard called Leverett House. At the annual Harvard-Yale football game, students from Timothy Dwight and Leverett will host each other depending on the site of that year's Game. Jeff Brenzel was appointed as the new master of Timothy Dwight College on April 25, 2010. Outgoing Master Robert F. Thompson welcomed Brenzel and his wife with a special rap: “The man who picks who gets into Yale / Now joyfully follow, their TD trail".

== Student life ==
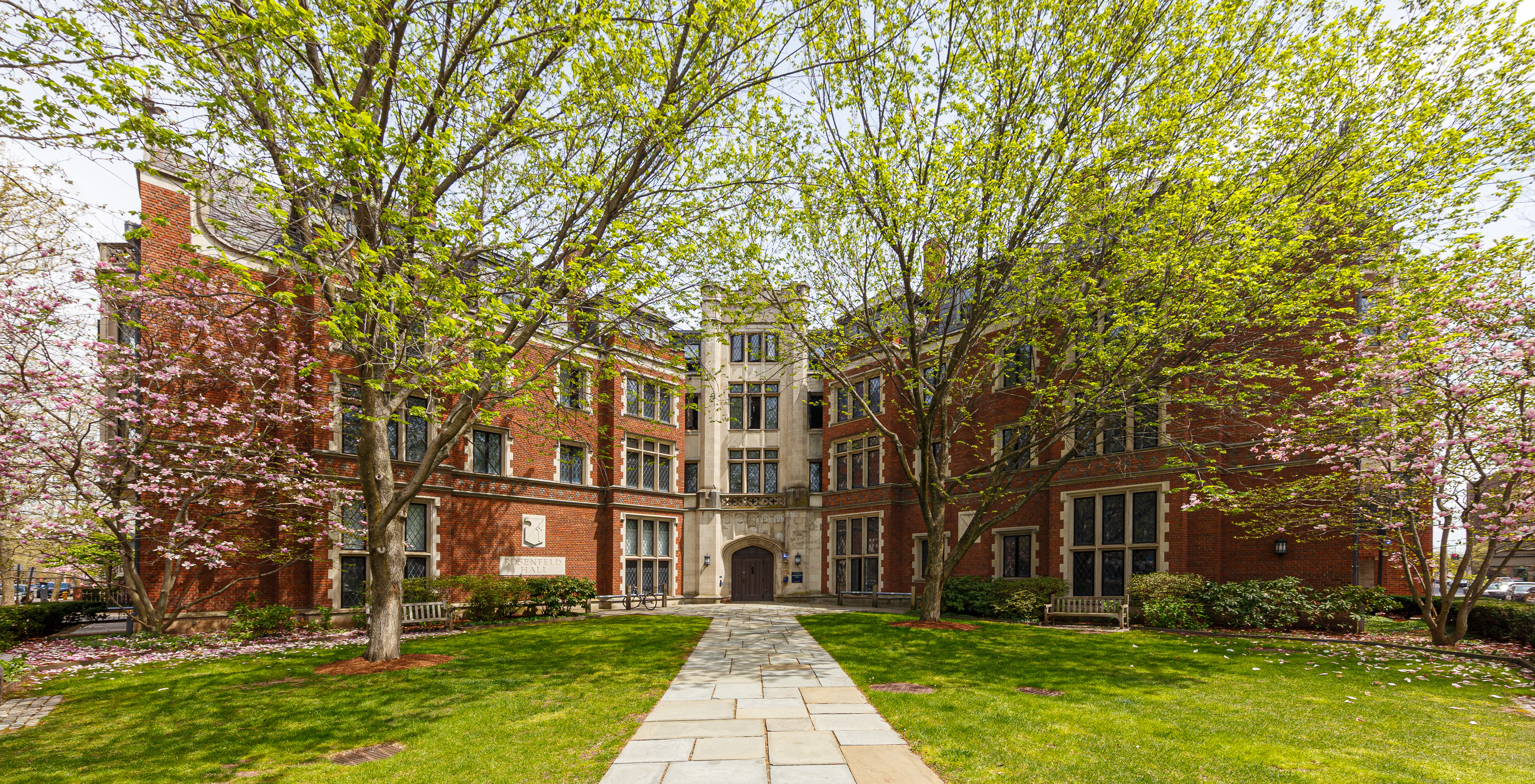
Rosenfeld Hall, originally built as the St. Elmo Society clubhouse

Timothy Dwight is one of the four residential colleges at Yale whose freshmen live within the college rather than on Old Campus. The living arrangements and the small size of the college are said to foster a community within the college, and Timothy Dwight was recognized as "The Most Spirited College" in a Yale Daily News poll from 2010. Freshmen in the college are treated every September to a retreat at a residential fellow's estate, complete with athletic fields and a pool. TD students also celebrate their residential college with an annual TD Weekend, comprising TD Day (referred to by TD students as TDDDTDD), where students have a barbecue, music, and inflatable games on Friday, and the Timothy Dwight Crawfish Boil on Saturday. The college has an annual tailgate on the morning of the Yale-Harvard football game in November.

Sunday to Thursday nights, from 10pm to 1am, the buttery of Timothy Dwight college is open to all Yale undergraduate students and guests. The TD Butt is a student-run diner that sells snacks and desserts, including quesadillas, cookie dough, popcorn chicken, and chocolate candy bars. The Timothy Dwight buttery has its own Yelp page.

Students in Timothy Dwight have excelled at intramural sports since the college's founding in 1935. In 1937, TD captured its first of its 13 Tyng Cups, Yale's intramural sports competition between the twelve residential colleges. TD has won the Tyng Cup more than any other college.

In the basement of the college, there are activity rooms to which students may gain swipe access; namely, the Selin Lounge, the art room, the music room, and the photography darkroom. The weight-lifting room and cardio rooms, as well as the student kitchen and games room, are open to all the students of the residential college.

Some Timothy Dwight students also choose to live in Rosenfeld Hall, located at 109 Grove Street. Often referred to as "RH" by TD students, the building is used as residential annex housing for TD upperclassmen and previously belonged to St. Elmo Society. The building also contains a classroom space which is open to most students at Yale.

== Coat of arms ==
In heraldic language, the coat of arms may be described as Argent, a lion passant above a cross crosslet fitchy gules; in a chief gules a crescent silver. The arms were likely invented by Jacob Hurd, a Boston silversmith, who engraved them on a tankard which he made in 1725 for the grandparents of the elder Timothy Dwight.

== Notable alumni ==
- Kingman Brewster, Jr., 1941: educator, President of Yale University and American diplomat.
- Guido Calabresi, 1953: currently a judge on the United States Court of Appeals for the Second Circuit, and Sterling Professor at Yale Law School. Also a former Dean of the Yale Law School.
- Lowell Weicker, 1953: the 85th governor of Connecticut.
- Porter Goss, 1960: director of the CIA in 2004–2006.
- Ron Rivest, 1969: founder of RSA Security and technology guru.
- Benjamin Sommer, 1964: biblical scholar and Jewish theologian
- Gilbert F. Casellas, 1974: Chairman of the Equal Employment Opportunity Commission under President Bill Clinton.
- Oren Patashnik, 1976: well-known computer scientist who created BibTeX.
- Nathaniel Kahn, 1985: Academy Award-nominated for his documentary "My Architect," about his father, Louis Kahn.
- Jay Carney, 1987: The 29th White House Press Secretary, 2011–2014.
- Chris Dudley, 1987: professional NBA basketball player.
- Shawn Levy, 1989: film director.
- Sarah Hughes, 2008: Olympic gold medal-winning figure skater.
