= Data Resources =

American economic research organization

- Industry: Econometric models, research, analysis
- Headquarters: Lexington, Massachusetts, United States
- Key people: Donald Marron and Otto Eckstein

Data Resources Inc or DRI was co-founded in 1969 by Donald Marron and Otto Eckstein. Marron is best known as the former CEO of PaineWebber and founder of Lightyear Capital. Eckstein was a Harvard University economics professor, economic consultant to Lyndon Baines Johnson and member of the Council of Economic Advisors; he is best known for the development of the theory of core inflation.

DRI became the largest non-governmental distributor of economic data in the world. The company also built the largest macroeconometric model of its era. Allen Sinai was a leading architect. Richard Hokenson did much of the maintenance work.

DRI was a major customer of Burroughs Computer. During the 1970s era of rapid expansion, DRI used the Burroughs 6700 and 7700 mainframes. DRI also developed innovative software, including the PRIMA and AID database languages; EPL Econometric Programming Language; MODSIM for solving models; and MODEL for solving econometric models in particular. Later the functionality of all these programs was merged into the EPS Econometric Programming System by the chief architect of all this software, Robert P. Lacey. Other programmers in this effort included John Ahlstrom, Greg George, and Joe Polak.

The DRI Review was published monthly and summarized what the models said for the economic outlook. This information was presented in outlook conferences. DRI also held educational seminars.

== General corporate timeline ==
- 1979: Eckstein and Marron sold DRI to McGraw-Hill for over $100 million Joseph Kasputys was named president in 1981.
- 1984: After Eckstein's death, DRI was slow to adopt new technology. DRI was wed to mainframe computers when the industry was moving this kind of analytic work to personal computers.
- 1987: Wharton Econometric Forecasting Associates (WEFA) merged with Chase Econometrics, a competitor to DRI and WEFA.
- 2001: DRI merged with WEFA to form Global Insight.
- 2008: Global Insight was bought by IHS Inc., thus inheriting 50 years of experience and more than 200 full-time economists, country risk analysts, and consultants.
