= Leverett House =

Residential House of Harvard College

- Residential House
- Harvard University
- Shield
- Location: 28 DeWolfe Street
- Coordinates: 42°22′12″N 71°07′03″W
- Full name: John Leverett House
- Established: 1931
- Named for: John Leverett
- Sister college: Timothy Dwight College
- Faculty Deans: Eileen Reynolds and Daniel Deschler
- Dean: John Nowak
- HoCo chairs: Hayden Graham, Mira Jiang
- Undergraduates: 500
- Tutors: 20
- Called: Leverites; Informally, "Bunnies," "Rabbits," and "Hares"
- Website: leverett.harvard.edu

Leverett House is one of twelve undergraduate residential Houses at Harvard University. It is situated along the north bank of the Charles River in Cambridge and consists of McKinlock Hall, constructed in 1925; two 12-story towers completed in 1960; and two floors of 20 DeWolfe Street, a building Leverett shares with two other houses at Harvard.

== Structure ==
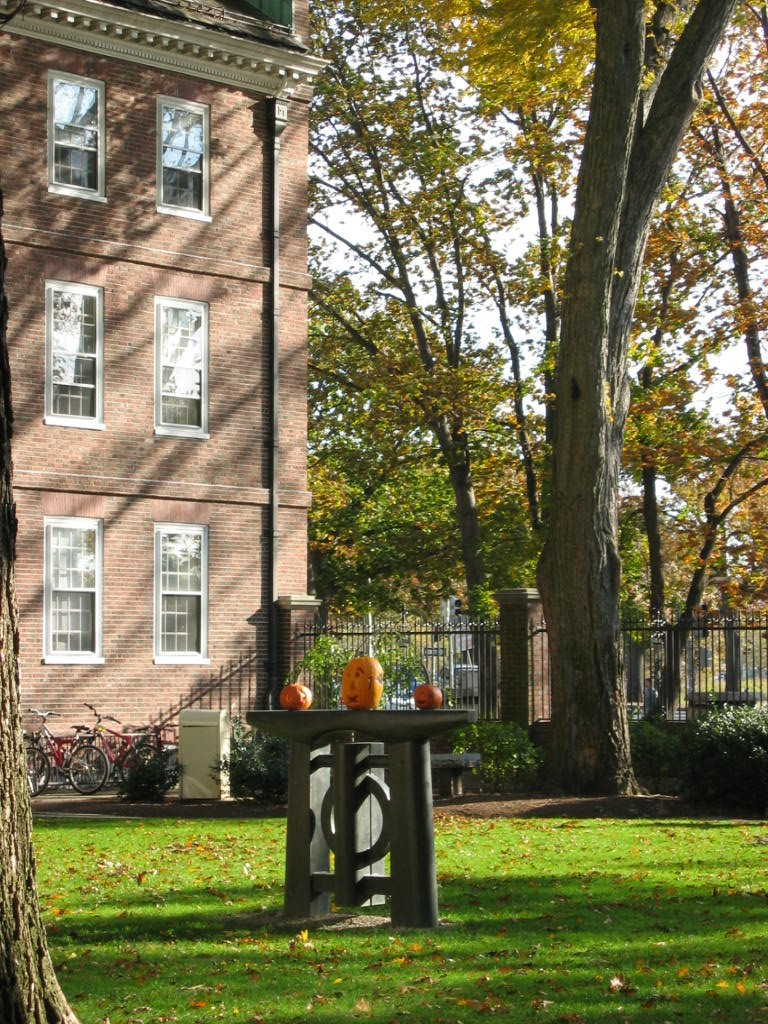
McKinlock Courtyard

When Leverett House opened in 1931, it originally occupied two buildings: McKinlock Hall and Stone Hall, which Quincy House now occupies and to which students often refer, perhaps misleadingly, as "Old Quincy." Today, House's facilities currently consists of three main residential buildings, McKinlock Hall, F-Tower, and G-Tower; a subsidiary building housing the House Library and building services; and several apartment suites annexed from the former DeWolfe graduate housing.

The bulk of McKinlock Hall consists of 5 entryways (labeled A through E), each of which leads to four or five floors of suites for approximately 35 students. Prior to McKinlock's 2014 renovations, each of these entryways was centered around a single stairwell, accessible only from a single door—the "entryway"—on the exterior of the building. This is the predominant arrangement of Harvard dormitories prior to the mid-20th century. The 2014 renovation replaced the entryway arrangement with a more typical hallway arrangement.

McKinlock Hall's oval window belongs to the Iliad Suite, named for an anonymous donor. This suite, highly coveted amongst Leverett seniors, is awarded to the “Most Attractive” group of rising seniors selected during a House-wide popular vote. Historically, the suite was awarded to the winners of a House-wide wet t-shirt contest, a practice banned in the early 2010s due to protests from female students that began after Radcliffe College's full incorporation into Harvard College. McKinlock also houses the Leverett Dining Hall, the Junior and Senior Common Rooms, the Old Library Theatre, the Faculty Dean's Residence, and several other common spaces.

The Leverett Towers (commonly referred to as F- and G-Tower, corresponding to their respective entryway labels) serve a primarily residential function. Each tower consists primarily of singles and doubles and holds approximately 150 students. The top floors of the towers - especially those facing south - boast outstanding views of the Boston skyline and the Charles River.

The ground floor of G-Tower features a common area called "G-Hutch." Like the Iliad Suite's wet t-shirt contest, protests from female students led to the renaming of G-Hutch from a similar, but more inappropriate name. G-Tower has been historically associated with small-scale, all-male group sexual encounters. The reason for this association has sparked ample debate; although the most well-evidenced and most likely reason for this association is the actual occurrence of such events, some alumni have suggested that this name may simply be the pun "Or-G-Tower."

The ground floor of F-tower includes a common area similar to the one found in G-Tower, as well as several offices belonging to the Allston Burr Resident Dean and House Administrator. Between the towers and McKinlock sits the Leverett Library, which was constructed along with the towers and has won awards for its innovative design. The ground floor of the library building houses the building manager's office.

The top floors of 20 DeWolfe Street were annexed by the house in fall of 2007. Originally intended for faculty or graduate students, the DeWolfe suites are smaller apartment-style units with different amenities than those available in either McKinlock or Leverett Towers, including kitchens and a year-round HVAC system.

== History ==
Leverett House was named after John Leverett the Younger, whose grandfather, John Leverett, had been the governor of the Massachusetts Bay Colony. Leverett the Younger was president of Harvard from 1708 to 1724. His election was one of the significant turning points for Harvard, for every president before him had been a clergyman. Leverett was a leader of the liberal movement in the Congregational Church and he opposed the powerful clergymen Increase Mather and Cotton Mather, who had attempted to impose upon the College a new charter containing a loyalty oath that would have refused appointment to the faculty of anyone not willing to acknowledge the primacy of Biblical scripture. Leverett, during his tenure as president, improved the quality of instruction in the College, and maintained the position of Harvard in the critical years when Yale was becoming a formidable rival.

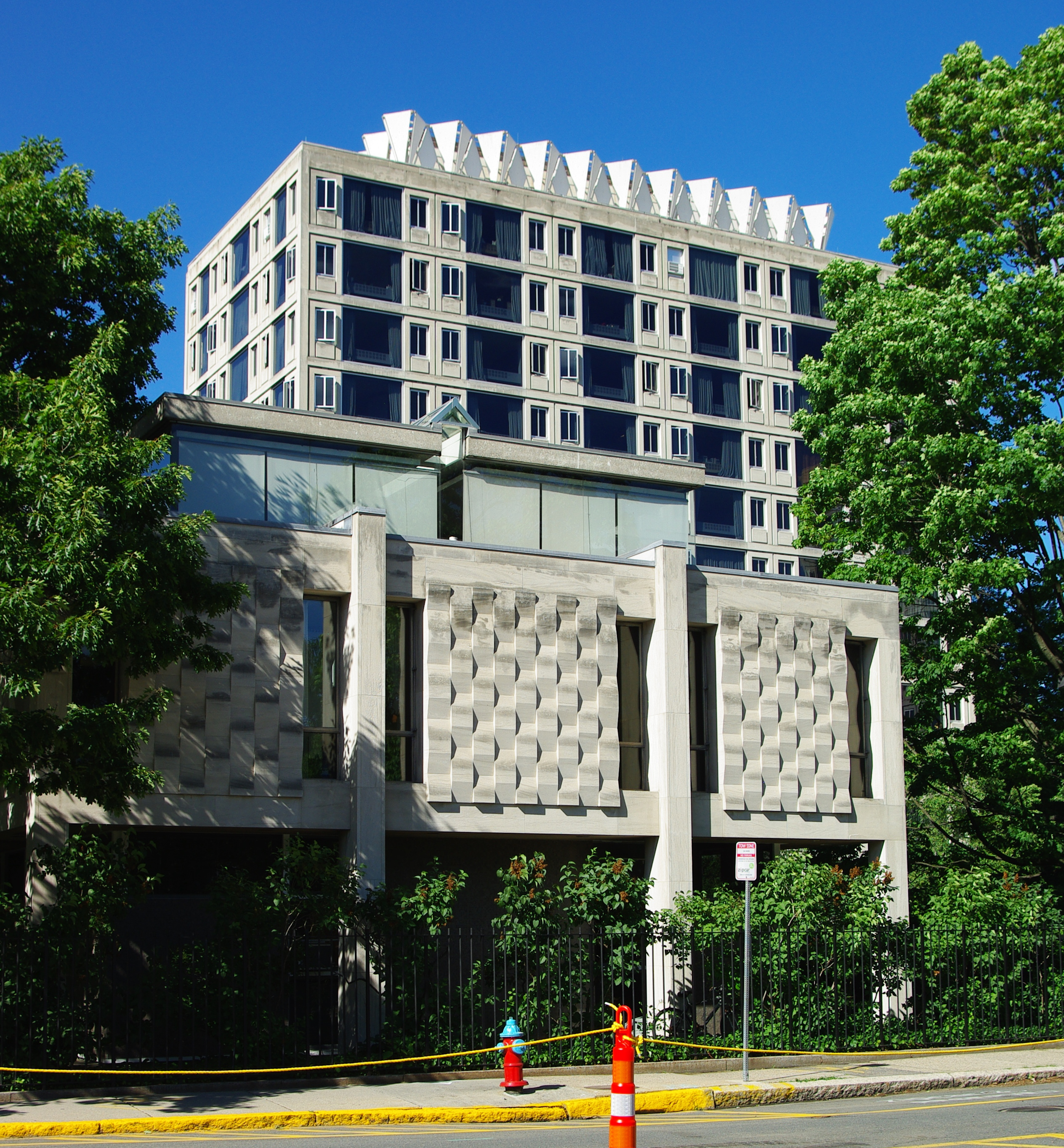
Leverett F-Tower, with the house library in the foreground

In the mid-1920s, Harvard constructed student residences on the banks of the recently dammed Charles River. These residences were initially occupied by freshmen. McKinlock Hall, built in 1925, was one of those original buildings. The building was donated by the family of Lieutenant George Alexander McKinlock Jr, a Harvard graduate who was killed by a German machine gun near Soissons in 1918.

With the formation of Leverett House in 1930-31, Mather Hall, across Mill Street, was built along with the present dining hall and Master's residence. Six squash courts were also constructed, adjacent to Mather Hall. Leverett remained in that configuration until the early 1960s, when the College expanded and new Houses were added. Mather Hall became a part of Quincy House, the squash courts were lost, and the Leverett Towers were built. The Saltonstall family gave money for a new library in honor of the ten generations of Saltonstalls who had attended Harvard, and the House offices moved to the first floor of F-Tower. Shepley, Bulfinch, Richardson and Abbott designed the two-story library, as well as the two twelve-story Leverett Towers that were constructed at the same time. In 1983, McKinlock was renovated, and at that time a new entrance to the dining hall was constructed.

The first Master of the House was Kenneth Murdock, Professor of English and Dean of the Faculty of Arts and Sciences.

The second Master was Leigh Hoadley, an embryologist and professor of zoology. Hoadley resigned in 1957, shortly before Leverett was to be renovated.

The third Master was John J. Conway, a scholar of Canadian history. He married his wife Jill, who was a graduate student in Harvard's history department at the time, in the early 1960s.

The fourth Master was Richard T. Gill, an economist. A bass singer, Gill sang each year in the Leverett House Opera, which was a fixture in the House. While Master, he auditioned for the New York City Opera and was offered a contract. He accepted and left Harvard, economics, and Leverett to begin a new career, first with the New York City Opera, and later with the Metropolitan Opera.

The fifth Co-Masters, Kenneth Andrews and Carolyn Andrews, were appointed in 1971. During their tenure, the Houses became coeducational. Andrews was a professor at Harvard Business School and the first Business School faculty member to be appointed Master. During Harvard's 350th anniversary celebration in 1986, Andrews was one of 20 individuals who received a Harvard Medal for distinguished service to the University. His citation read: "He understands, as Mark Twain never did, how business works best; his writings elucidate the complex subject to the benefit of his Harvard colleagues and of managers everywhere."

Renowned biologist John E. Dowling and his wife Judith were appointed as the sixth Co-Masters of Leverett House in 1981 and served until 1998.

The seventh Faculty Deans, Howard Georgi and his wife Ann, were appointed in 1998 and served until 2018. Known within the House community as "Chief" and "Coach," their two-decade tenure included traditions such as hosting weekly "Not-Just-Sherry Hour" receptions, serving fresh-baked monkey bread, and keeping dogs in the residence.

Brian D. Farrell and Irina Ferreras de la Maza were appointed as the eighth Faculty Deans in 2018. Farrell is a professor of biology and curator of entomology at the Museum of Comparative Zoology. Ferreras is a curatorial assistant at the Harvard University Herbaria.

The House's leadership in the mid- to late-2010s proved fraught and controversial. During Farrell's and Ferreras' time as Faculty Deans, they began initiatives to bring to the House an appreciation of art and nature. Tapping into their personal interests and areas of expertise, the Deans invited Brazilian artist Oscar Araripe to exhibit his works and began hosting nature walks for students. However, many students perceived these events as infrequent, unappealing, and inadequate; as a result, they received criticism for their perceived refusal to address student concerns and a perceived lack of dedication to the house. This, accompanied by their abandonment of the long-cherished house traditions established by the Georgis, led to a contentious house atmosphere. Farrell and Ferreras announced their departure following the 2022 academic year. This period coincided with Bilal A. Malik's tenure as Resident Dean. Malik ultimately departed early in the Fall Semester of 2019.

Eileen Reynolds and Daniel Deschler currently lead the house as faculty deans.

== Notable alumni ==
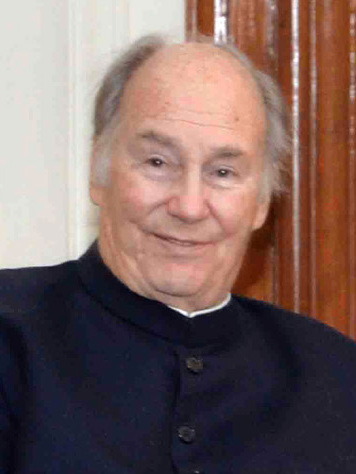
Aga Khan IV

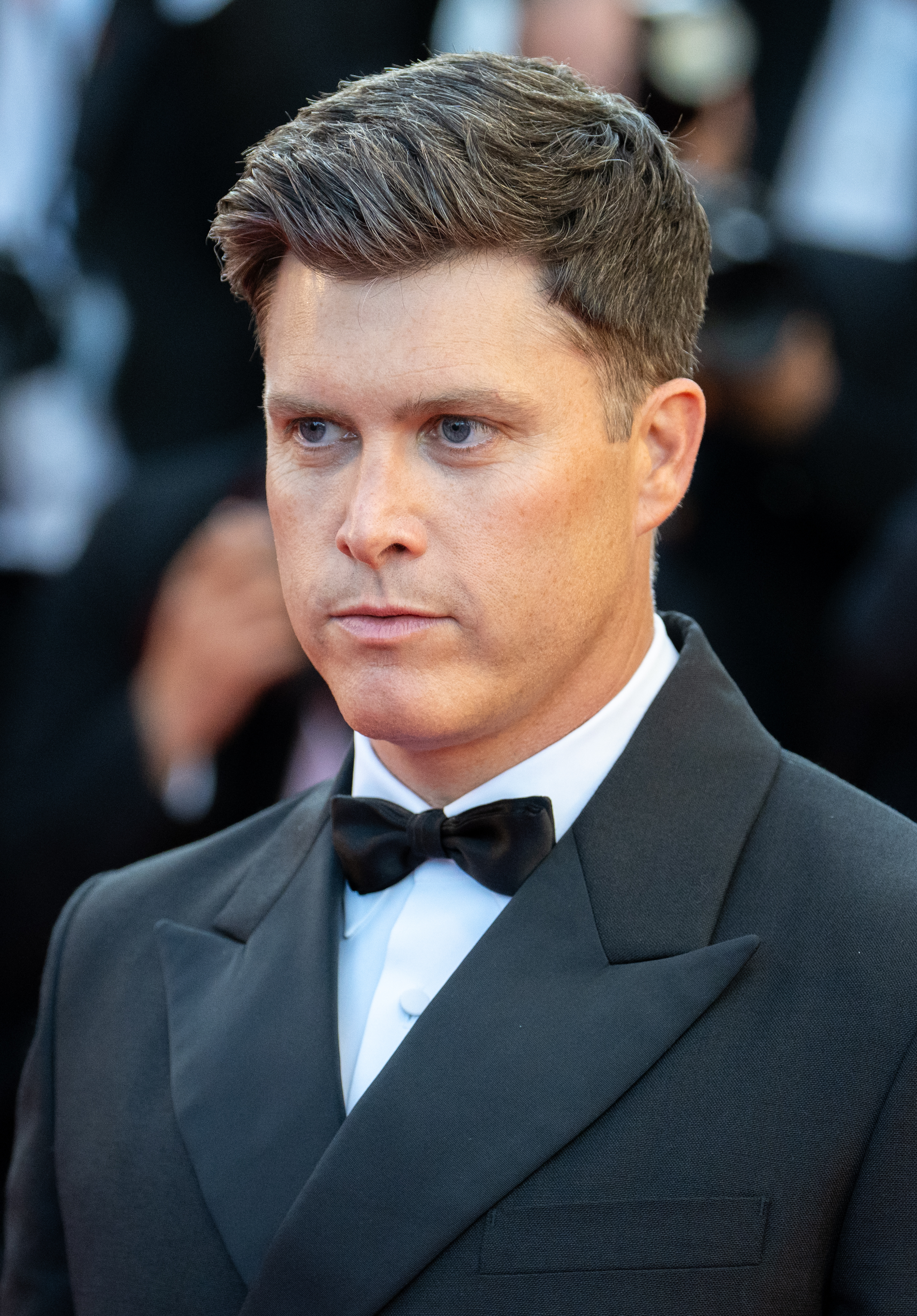
Colin Jost

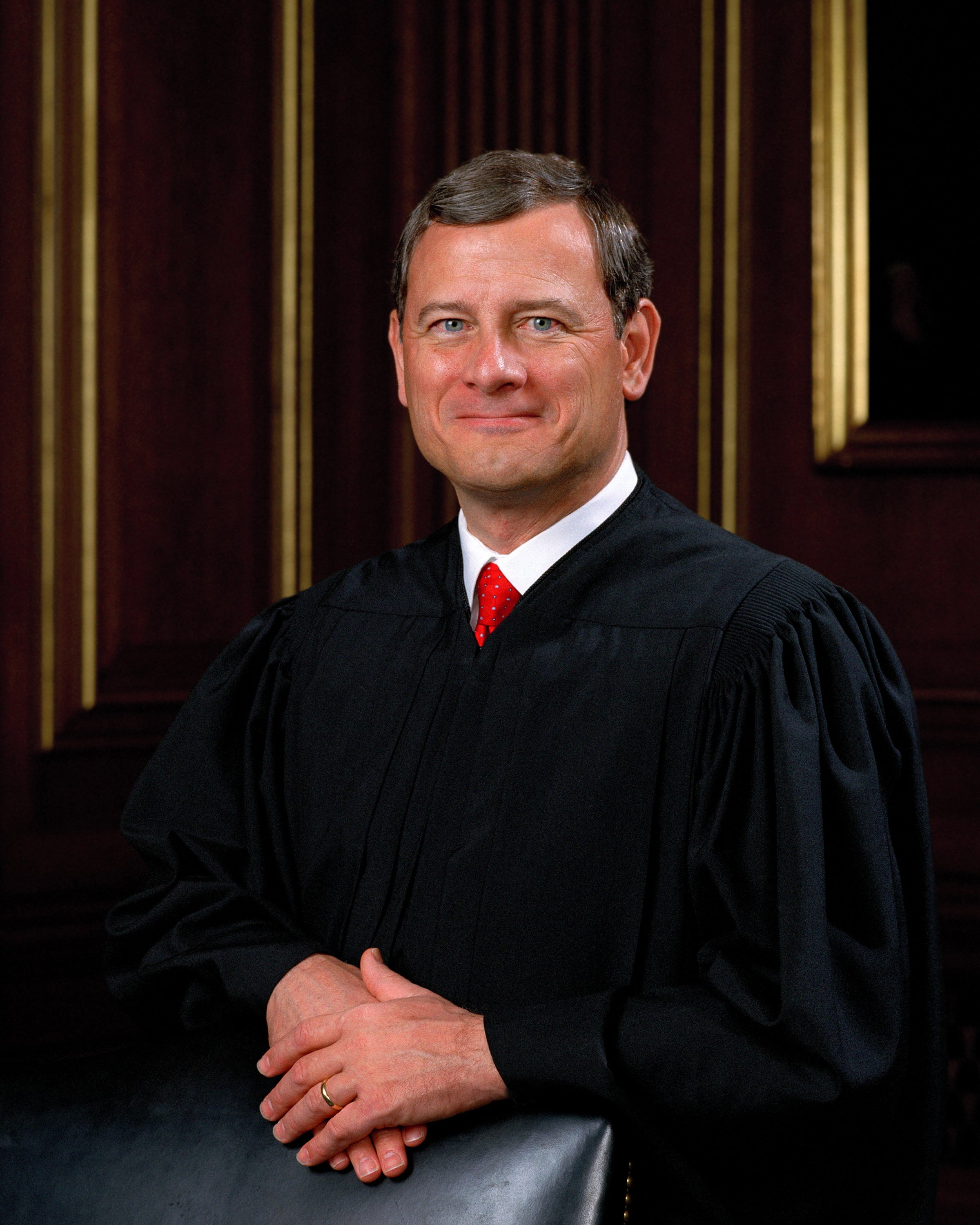
John Roberts

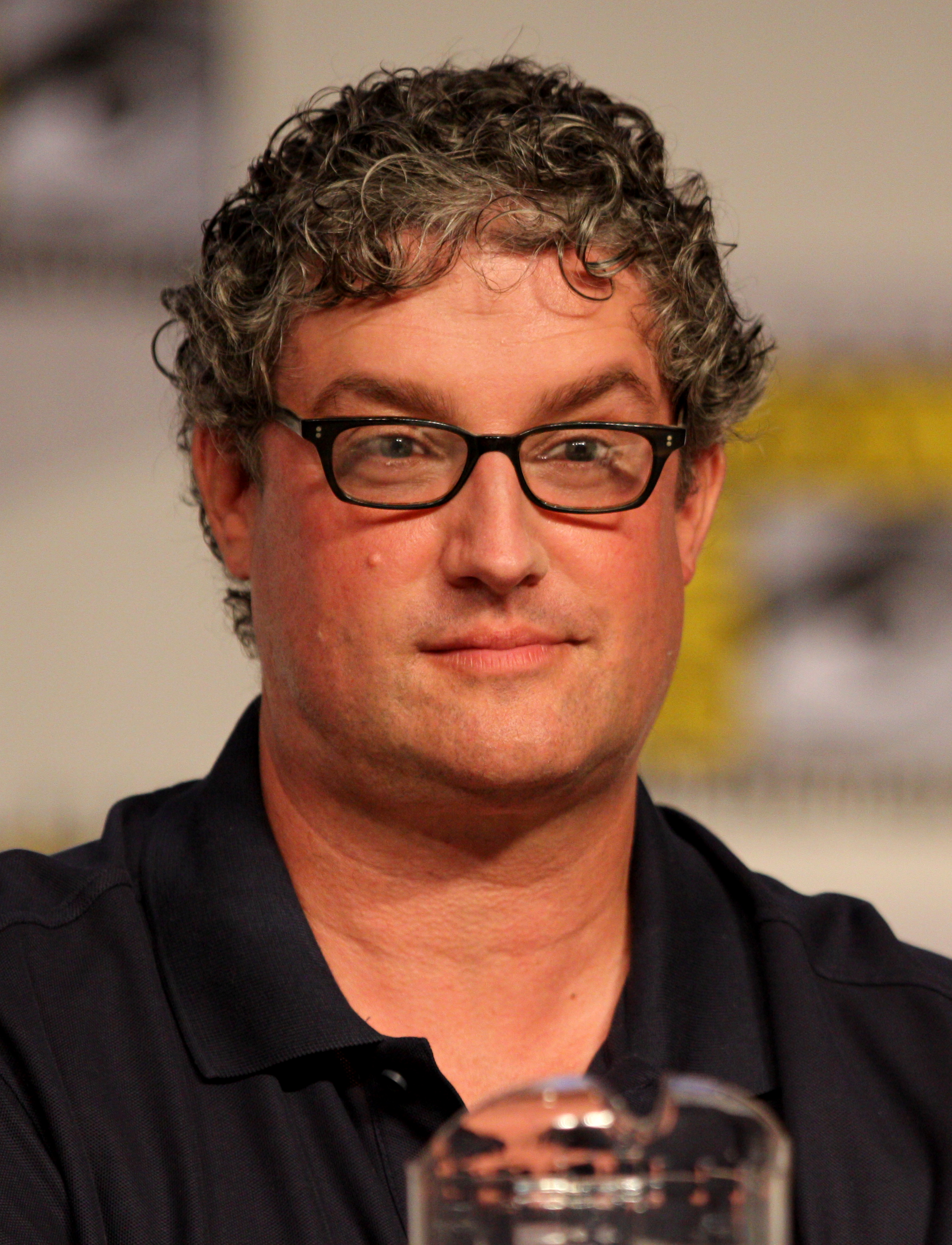
Al Jean

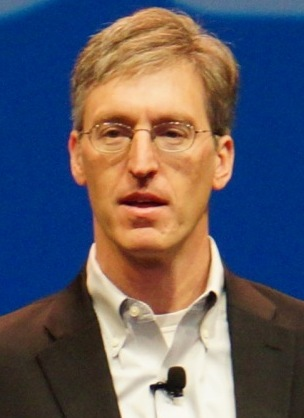
Steven Levitt

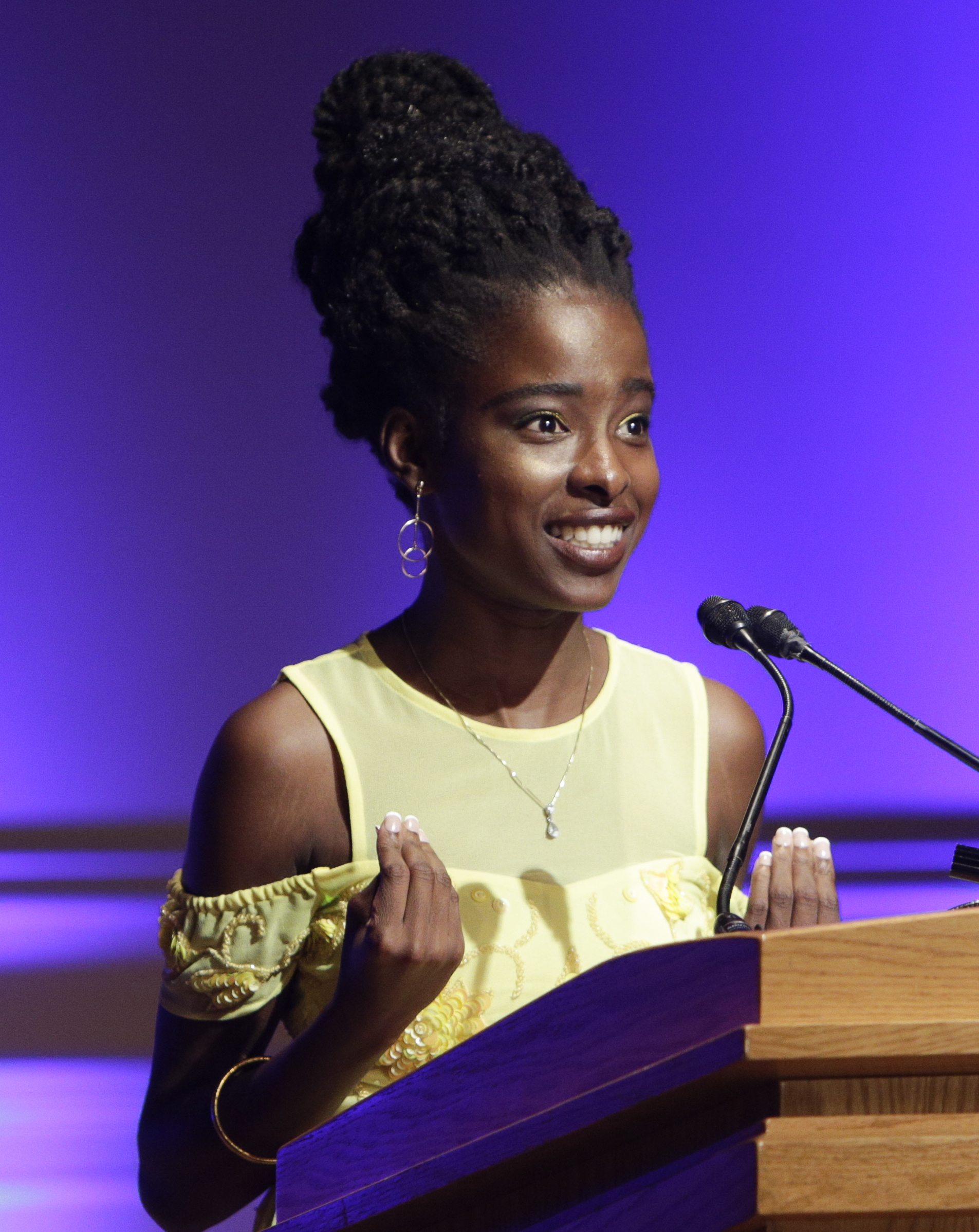
Amanda Gorman

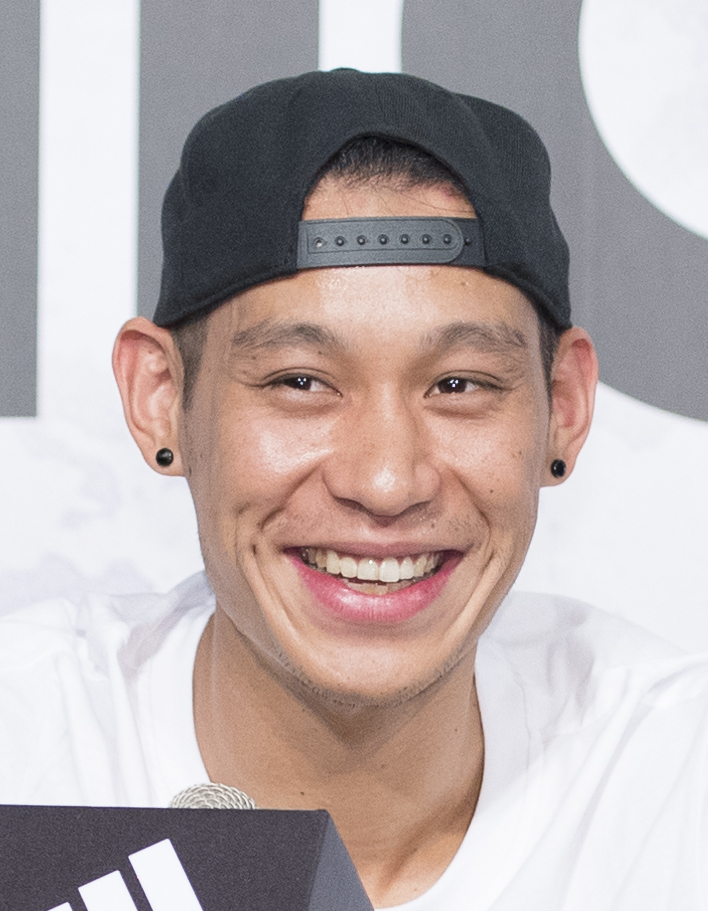
Jeremy Lin

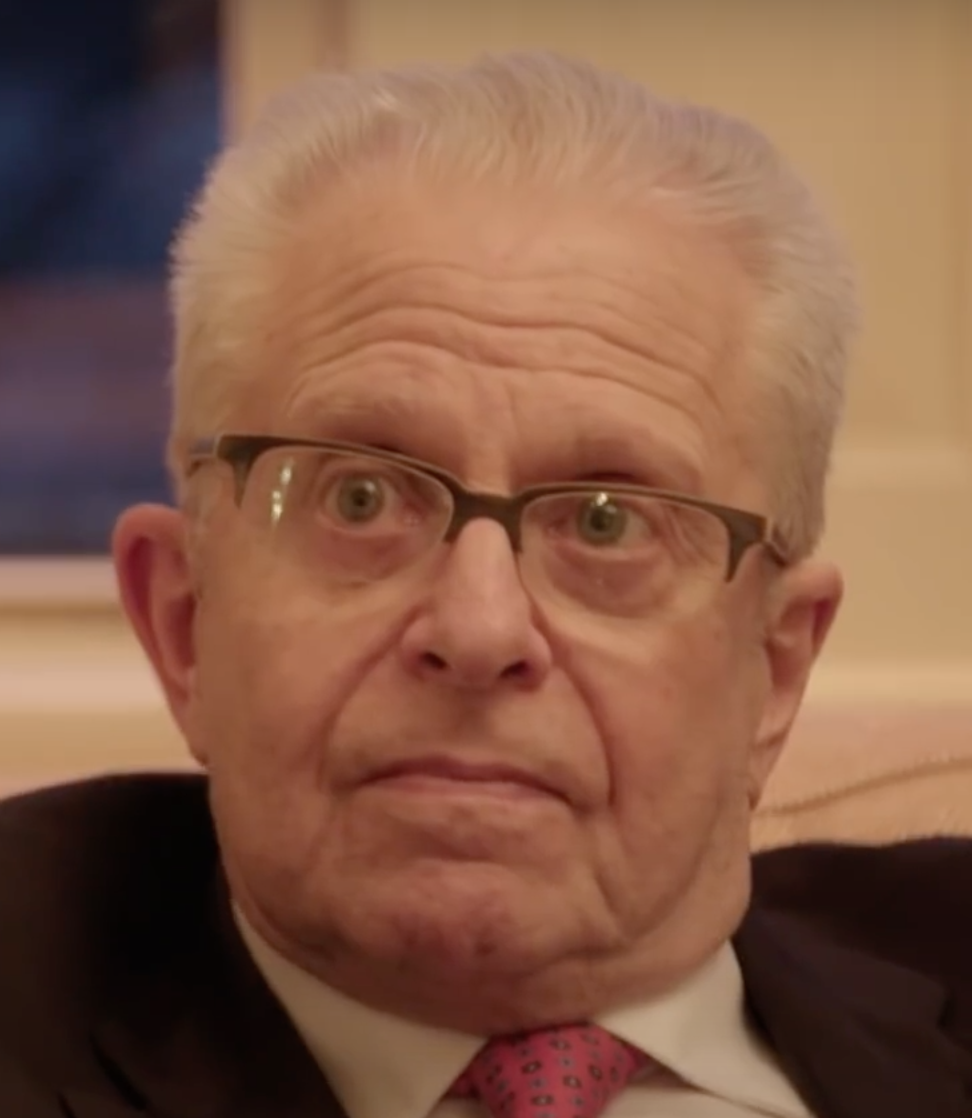
Laurence Tribe

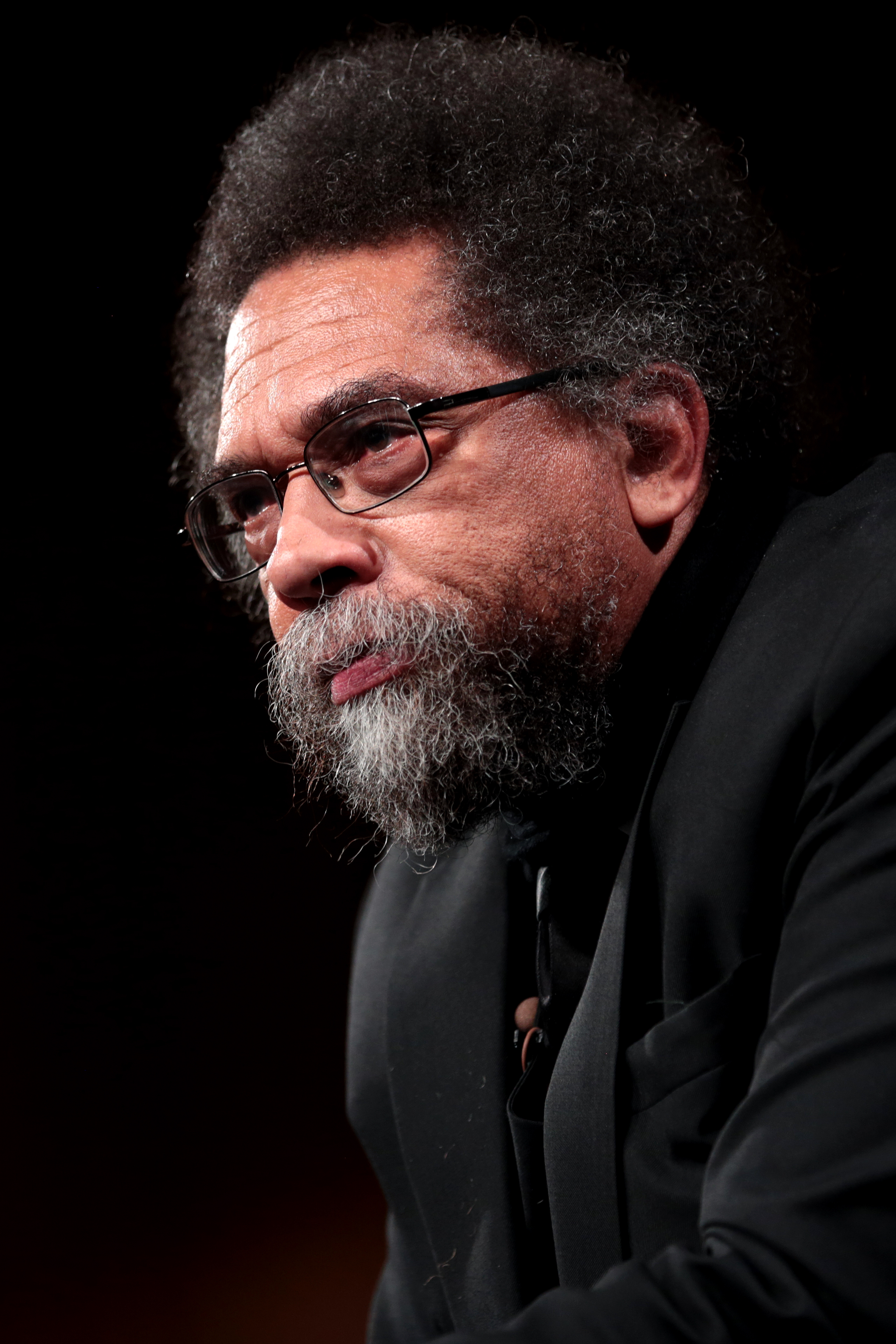
Cornel West

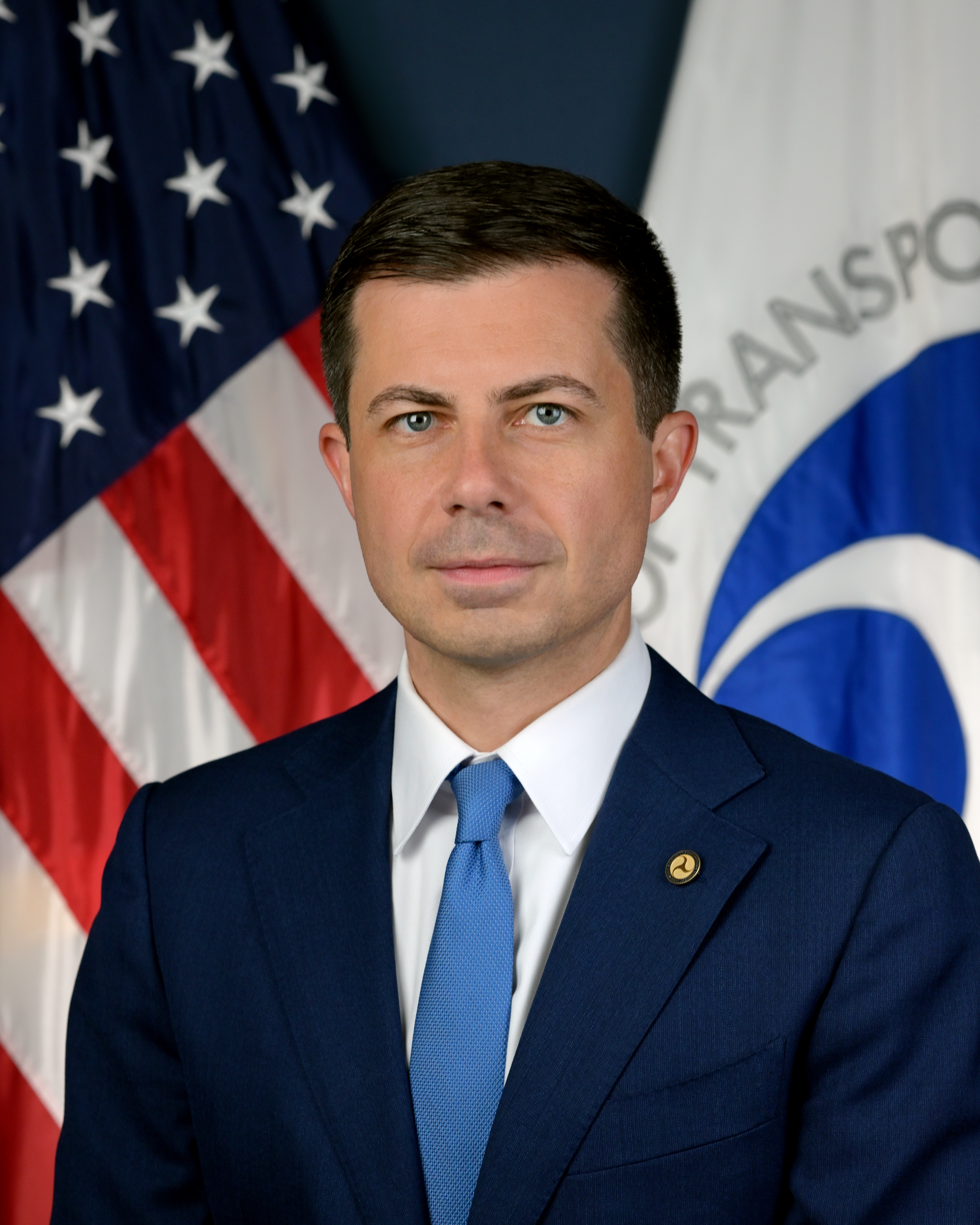
Pete Buttigieg

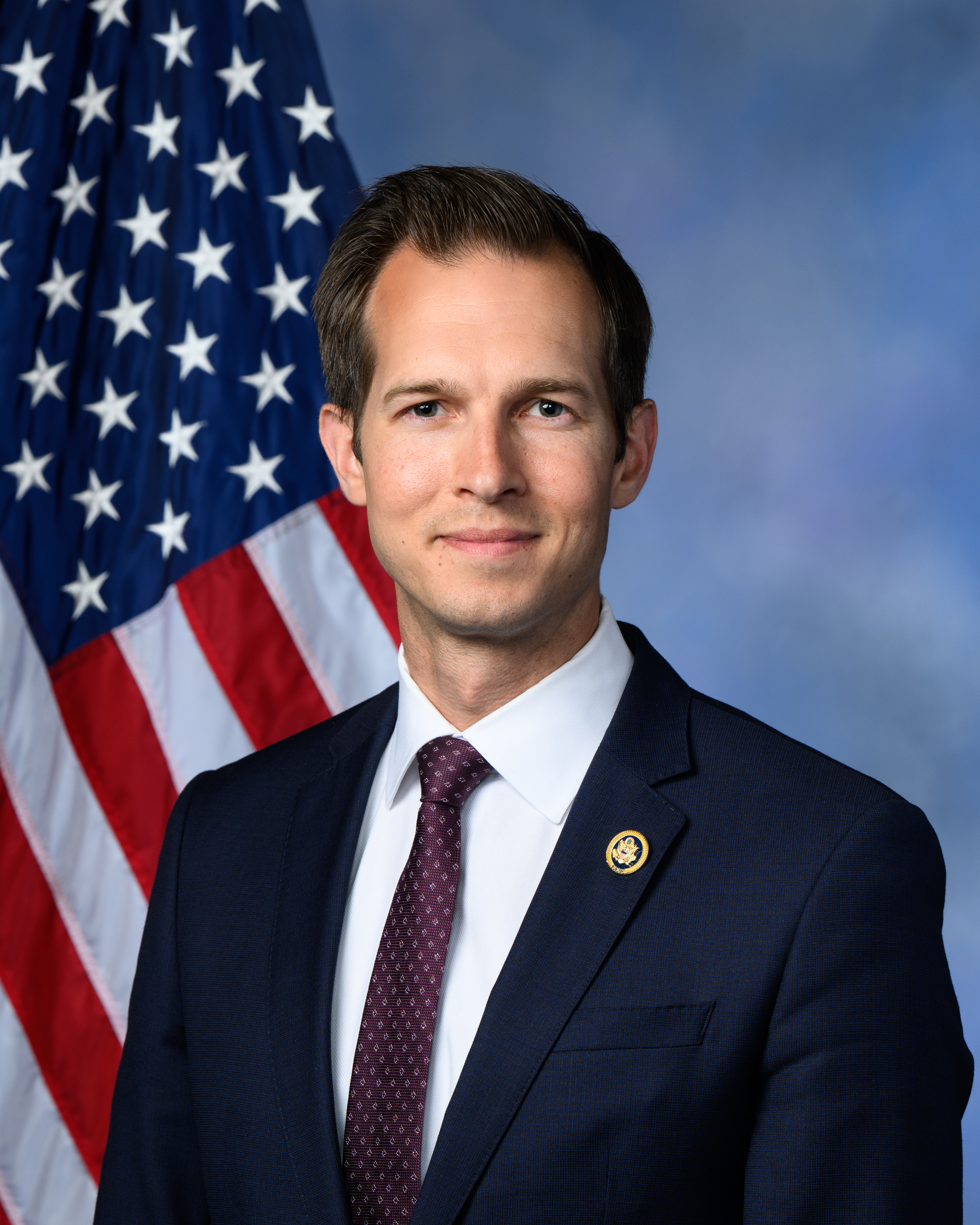
Jake Auchincloss

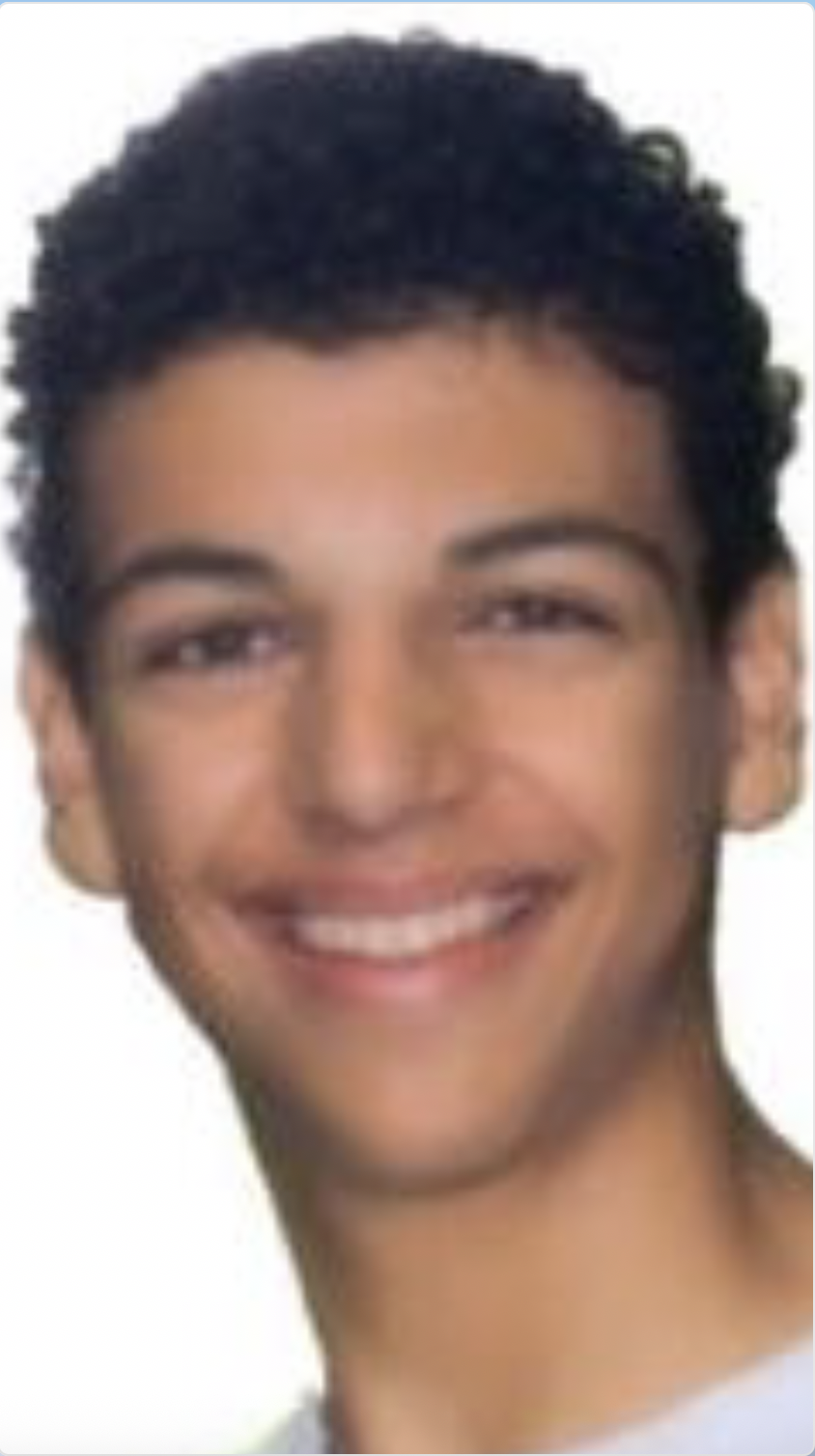
Amir Siraj

Other notable alumni of Leverett House include Juan Enríquez Cabot, Roger W. Ferguson, Jr., Fernando Gonzalez Sfeir, Gabrielle Zevin, Timothy Crouse, Andrew Glaze, Alexander Keyssar, Anthony Lake, Saul Perlmutter, Mike Reiss, Sydney Schanberg, Pete Seeger, John Weidman, Archibald MacLeish, Perry Miller, Lillian Hellman, Arne Duncan, and Shaun Donovan. Yo-Yo Ma, who lived in Currier House as undergraduate, was a music tutor for the house.

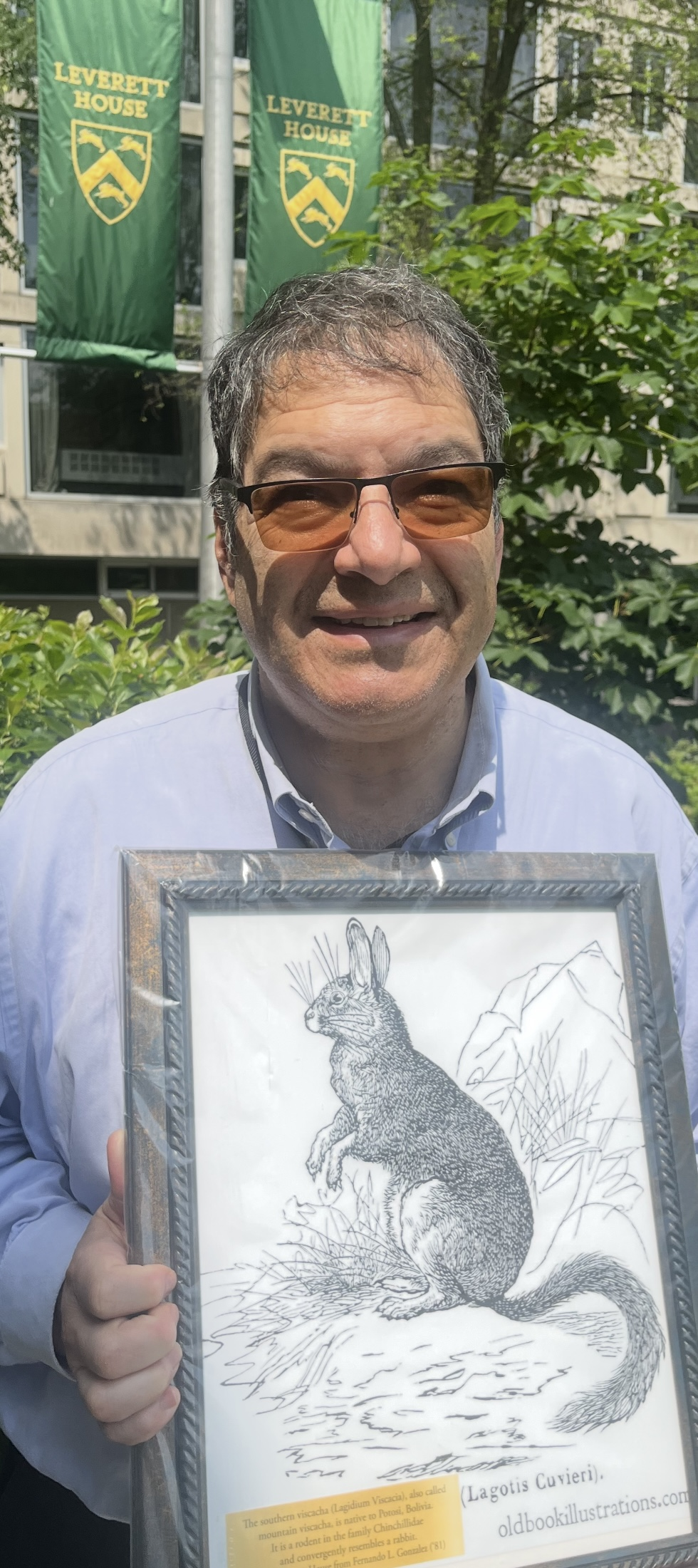
Fernando Gonzalez at Leverett House, June 11, 2025

== House symbols ==
The House shield is a derivative of the ancient Leverett family crest depicting three hares rampant with an inverted chevron. The family name is derived from the word "leveret" (with one "t"), which means young hare; family tradition has it that the earliest recorded family members were keepers of ferrets, which were trained to chase rabbits from their burrows. The official house colors are black and yellow, appearing on the earliest House paraphernalia that can be found. However, the combinations of black and red as well as green and yellow are often used. Annual T-shirt designs usually feature some combination of those four colors. Leverett House has a sister house at Yale, Timothy Dwight College.

== House traditions ==
Leverett offers a host of fun, student-friendly events throughout the year. The house draws on its leporine heritage for many of its traditions. This includes its annual tulip bulb planting soiree. Another rabbit-inspired event, the annual "Lettuce Love" lettuce-eating contest, was suspended indefinitely following widespread reports of cyclosporiasis contamination throughout the United States.
