= David Gardner (fiddler) =

David M. Gardner
- Birth name: David M. Gardner
- Genres: Scottish (18th Century)
- Occupation(s): Performer, teacher, judge; high school teacher
- Instrument(s): Fiddle, vocals, bones
- Years active: 1980s–present
- Website: www.gardnerfiddle.com

David M. Gardner is a Scottish fiddle performer, teacher, and judge.

In the 1980s, while a student at the College of William and Mary, he began studying music with John Turner. Though he graduated with a degree in anthropology and archaeology and spent some time as a teacher, he continued pursuing traditional Scottish music.

Gardner regularly plays in Colonial Williamsburg, and is a member of The Virginia Company—an 18th-century music trio which has performed in the Kennedy Center and other notable venues. He has won numerous regional fiddling competitions, and placed third in the 2009 national championships after initially being part of a three-way tie for first place. He is also a Scottish FIRE-sanctioned judge, and has judged numerous national competitions. He also teaches private lessons, workshops, and at music camps. He's married to Heather Gardner and has a son named Devon Gardner and a daughter named Eliza Gardner.

Gardner also has a musical instrument endorsement from the state of Virginia and is the recipient of a Fulbright Award, which sponsored a trip to Germany in 2003.
