= David Gardner (cricketer) =

English cricketer (1940–2023)

Personal information
- Full name: David Denis Gardner
- Born: 11 September 1940; Swindon, Wiltshire, England
- Died: 17 May 2023 (aged 82); Swindon, Wiltshire, England
- Nickname: Lardy
- Batting: Right-handed

Domestic team information
- Years: Team
- 1959–1976: Wiltshire

Career statistics
Competition	List A
Matches	2
Runs scored	31
Batting average	15.50
100s/50s	0/0
Top score	20
Catches/stumpings	1/–
- Source: Cricinfo, 10 October 2010

David Denis Gardner (11 September 1940 – 17 May 2023) was an English cricketer.

Gardner was born at Swindon in September 1940, where he was educated at Sanford Street School. He was a talented schoolboy footballer, who represented England Schools' against Scotland Schools' in front of 10,000 spectators at Wembley Stadium. He trialled with West Brom for a few seasons, but was not invited back following an injury. In cricket, Gardner initially played his club cricket in Swindon for Swindon British Rail Cricket Club from the mid-1950s until 1970, after which he joined Swindon Cricket Club. In club cricket, he scored over 10,000 runs. Gardner made his debut in minor counties cricket for Wiltshire against the Gloucestershire Second XI at Trowbridge in the 1959 Minor Counties Championship. He played minor counties cricket for Wiltshire until 1976, making 78 appearances. In addition to playing minor counties matches, Gardner also made two appearances for Wiltshire in List A one-day cricket against first-class opponents in the form of Nottinghamshire in the 1965 Gillette Cup, and Essex in the 1969 Gillette Cup. He scored 31 runs in these matches. Unusually, Gardner was known to bat without pads and instead improvised by wrapping towels around his legs for protection.

He was a keen golfer at Ogbourne Downs and was a supporter of both Swindon Robins and Swindon Town. Gardner died in Swindon at the Great Western Hospital on 17 May 2023, at the age of 82, having been unwell for a number of months.
