= Richard T. Gill =

American opera singer

Richard Thomas Gill (November 30, 1927 – October 25, 2010) was an American economist and opera singer. He held several teaching and administrative positions at Harvard University over 22 years. He was Assistant Dean of Harvard College, Allston Burr Senior Tutor (Dean) of Leverett House, and Teaching Fellow, Instructor, and Assistant Professor of Economics. In 1963, he received tenure as Lecturer on Economics and Master of Leverett House.

Gill was born in Long Branch, New Jersey. Though he did not study voice formally, he was a boy soprano in his church choir and played the clarinet. At 16 he entered Harvard, where he sang in the glee club. He left Harvard to serve in the United States Army where he saw duty during the American Occupation of Japan. After completing his military service, he returned to Harvard, where he completed his undergraduate degree in 1948. He returned to Harvard after doing graduate work in philosophy at the University of Oxford and was named an assistant dean at Harvard at age 21. He earned a Ph.D. in economics from the university in 1956.

== Harvard career ==
For over a decade, Gill directed Economics 1, which became, at that time, the largest elective course in the college's history. He also taught courses in economic development, public policy, and economic theory for graduate and undergraduate students.

He was a member of numerous university committees, including the Committee on Educational Policy, the Administrative Board, the Kimball Fund, the Committee on Admissions and Scholarships, and the Ford Faculty Fellowship Program. He was the co-author of a major report on the reform of the Harvard General Education Program, and the sole author of a report on Harvard's honors and tutorial programs.

== Opera career ==
Gill left Harvard in 1971 and spent the next decade and a half as an opera singer. He debuted as principal artist (bass) with the New York City Opera, his roles there including Sarastro (The Magic Flute), Enrico (Anna Bolena), Sir Giorgio (I Puritani), Seneca (Poppea), Colline (La bohème), and Pogner (Die Meistersinger von Nürnberg).

He made his debut with the Metropolitan Opera in 1973. His roles there included Pimen (Boris Godunov), Friar Laurence (Roméo et Juliette), Timur (Turandot), Iero (Siege of Corinth), Commendatore (Don Giovanni), and others.

He appeared as principal artist with the opera companies of Chicago, Houston, Dallas, Boston, Washington, D.C., Pittsburgh, Caracas. Toronto, Edinburgh, Amsterdam, and many others. He was in several world premieres, including Philip Glass's Satyagraha.

He also appeared as a soloist with many symphony orchestras, including the New York Philharmonic (under Leonard Bernstein), the Boston Symphony, Pittsburgh Symphony, and the St. Louis Symphony. His radio appearances included several Texaco Metropolitan broadcasts, Chicago Lyric broadcasts, and broadcasts of the New York City Opera, New York Philharmonic, and Radio France, Paris. He also appeared in a telecast of Joan of Arc produced by the Canadian National Opera.

While a singer, he was elected to the Board of Governors and subsequently First Vice President of the American Guild of Musical Artists (AGMA), the principal union for classical operatic singers, ballet dancers, and stage directors in the United States.

== Media career ==
Gill was the primary economic analyst on the Annenberg–CPB television series Economics U$A.

He wrote 11 textbooks, one novel (The Taking of Farnham Hall: Searching for Reality in the 1960s, 2003), and several short stories.

A resident of Chocorua, New Hampshire, he died of heart failure at the age of 82 on October 25, 2010 in Providence, Rhode Island.
