= Lightyear Capital =

American private equity firm

- Type: Private
- Industry: Private equity
- Founded: 2000; 26 years ago
- Founder: Donald Marron
- Headquarters: New York City, United States
- Key people: Mark Vassallo (Managing Partner)
- Products: Leveraged buyout, Growth capital
- AUM: US$8.1 billion (as of December 31, 2025)
- Website: www.lycap.com

Lightyear Capital is an American private equity firm based in New York City that makes leveraged buyout and growth capital investments, primarily in financial services, financial technology, healthcare, and business-services companies. The firm was founded in 2000 by Donald Marron, the former chairman and chief executive of PaineWebber, and has been led by managing partner Mark Vassallo since Marron's death in 2019. As of December 31, 2025, it reported approximately US$8.1 billion in assets under management.

== History ==
Lightyear was formed in 2000, shortly after the merger of PaineWebber and UBS that Marron negotiated and that closed in November 2000. Marron had been chairman and chief executive of PaineWebber for two decades and was earlier a co-founder of the economic-forecasting company Data Resources Inc. Following the merger he served as chairman of UBS Americas until 2003.

Marron died in December 2019. Mark Vassallo, who had worked alongside Marron at PaineWebber and joined Lightyear at its inception, continued to lead the firm as managing partner. In 2023 the firm named Tom Naratil, a former co-president of UBS Global Wealth Management, as an operating partner.

== Funds ==
Lightyear closed its first fund, the Lightyear Fund, in May 2002 with $750 million in commitments, about $500 million of which came from UBS. Its second fund closed in 2007 with $850 million from more than 40 investors.

The firm has raised approximately $3 billion since inception across its five funds. In May 2002, Lightyear closed on its first fund, The Lightyear Fund, with $750 million of investor commitments, approximately $500 million of which came from UBS AG. In 2007, the firm completed fundraising for its second private equity fund, with $850 million of commitments from over 40 investors. In March 2021, the firm filed documents stating that it had raised over $1.27 billion with 24 investors for its fifth fund, Lightyear Capital V.

== Investments ==
Lightyear's earlier investments included Collegiate Funding Services, which was acquired by JPMorgan Chase in 2005, the commercial-real-estate software provider ARGUS Software, the Lloyd's-market insurer Antares, and the structured-credit company Athilon Capital.

In 2014, Lightyear and the management of SunTrust Banks' asset-management arm acquired RidgeWorth Investments, an Atlanta-based multi-boutique manager with about $50 billion under management, for up to $265 million. Among the firm's later wealth-management investments were Wealth Enhancement Group, in which it acquired a majority stake in 2015; Allworth Financial, acquired in 2020 with the Ontario Teachers' Pension Plan and Cerity Partners.

Among the firm's most notable investments are Collegiate Funding Services (acquired by JPMorgan Chase), ARGUS Software, Higher One, NAU Country Insurance Company (the nation's third-largest crop insurer), Antares Holdings, New Flyer Industries, and Goldleaf Financial Solutions.

In 2013, Atlanta, divested its RidgeWorth Investments to Lightyear Capital LLC for up to $265 million.

In May 2019, Lightyear Capital acquired a controlling stake in Lighthouse Technologies Holdings Corporation.

In September 2021, Lightyear Capital acquired assets and partnered with Schellman & Company, LLC for the delivery of Information Technology and cybersecurity compliance services.

== Litigation ==
In February 2016, RCS Capital and Cetera Financial Group sued Lightyear and two former Cetera executives in U.S. Bankruptcy Court in Delaware, alleging that the executives had breached non-compete and confidentiality agreements by leaving to join Lightyear and the Advisor Group network it was then acquiring. The parties settled the dispute later that year, and Cetera dismissed its claims against the two former executives.
