= Donald B. Marron Jr. =

American economist, professor and policy advisor

Donald Marron

Director of the Congressional Budget Office Acting
- In office December 29, 2005 – January 18, 2007
- Preceded by: Douglas Holtz-Eakin
- Succeeded by: Peter R. Orszag

Personal details
- Born: Donald Baird Marron Jr. New York City, U.S.
- Party: Republican
- Relatives: Donald B. Marron Sr. (father)
- Education: Harvard University (BA); Massachusetts Institute of Technology (MA, PhD)

Donald Baird Marron Jr. is an American economist, professor and policy advisor and director of the nonpartisan Urban-Brookings Tax Policy Center in Washington, D.C. He is the son of the economist and financier Donald B. Marron Sr.

== Career ==
Marron was a member of the President's Council of Economic Advisers in 2008 and 2009. Earlier, he was the deputy director (2005–2007) and acting director (2006) of the nonpartisan Congressional Budget Office.

Marron's White House experience includes stints as a senior economic adviser and consultant to the Council of Economic Advisers (2007–08) and as its chief economist (2004–05). He was with Congress's Joint Economic Committee from 2002 to 2004, first as the Senate minority's principal economist and later as the committee's executive director and chief economist.

Before his government service, Marron was chief financial officer of a medical software start-up in Austin, Texas and a principal with the Washington, D.C., office of Charles River Associates, where he provided business consulting and litigation support to companies in a variety of industries.

He is also President of Marron Economics, LLC, through which he does consulting and public speaking.

Marron served as a member of the Debt Reduction Task Force at the Bipartisan Policy Center.

Currently, Marron is a visiting professor at the Georgetown Public Policy Institute in Washington DC
He also served as an assistant professor of economics at the University of Chicago’s Graduate School of Business from 1994 to 1998.

Marron is currently director of the Urban Institute-Brookings Institution Tax Policy Center.

Marron has written on a broad range of topics, including tax policy, intellectual property, and energy and environmental policy. He also edited the publications 30-Second Economics and 30-Second Money.

== Education ==
Marron graduated from Harvard College, summa cum laude in Mathematics, in 1987. He then attended the Massachusetts Institute of Technology, receiving a Ph.D. in economics, 1994.
