= David Gardiner (environmentalist) =

American environmental strategist (born 1955)

David McLane Gardiner (born 1955) is an American environmental strategist who has worked for the Clinton administration and United States Environmental Protection Agency. Gardiner was a member of the United States delegation present at the negotiations for the Kyoto Protocol.

== Education and early career ==
Gardiner graduated from Harvard University in 1977 with a degree in History, before joining the Sierra Club where he worked for 15 years. During his time working for the Sierra Club, Gardiner worked variously in the San Francisco office and as communication coordinator, before spending ten years working for them as Legislative Director in Washington, D.C. when the Sierra Club was lobbying for the Clean Air Act (1990) and other environmental protection legislation.

Gardiner joined the United States Environmental Protection Agency in 1993 as Assistant Administrator for Policy, Planning and Evaluation, a position he would remain in for six years. He also served as EPA Administrator Carol Browner's senior representative to the President’s Council on Sustainable Development during his time with the EPA.

Following on from his time with the EPA, Gardiner continued working with the Clinton administration, now working as an environmental strategist. He directed the White House Climate Change Task Force and spent time as a senior member of various United States delegations, including the 1997 delegation that negotiated the Kyoto Protocol.

== Later career ==
Gardiner served the Clinton administrator for almost the entire 8 years that Bill Clinton was President. He is currently the President of an environmental consultancy company, David Gardiner & Associates.
