= Donald B. Marron Sr. =

American financier (1934–2019)

Donald B. Marron
- Born: Donald Baird Marron; July 21, 1934; Goshen, New York, U.S.
- Died: December 6, 2019 (aged 85); New York City, U.S.
- Education: Bronx High School of Science; The City University of New York
- Occupations: Businessman, investor, philanthropist, investment banker
- Known for: Paine Webber (Former chairman & CEO); Lightyear Capital (Founder); Data Resources (Co-founder); Museum of Modern Art (MoMA) (Trustee and president emeritus)
- Spouse: Catherine "Catie" C. Marron (m. 1985)
- Children: 4, including Donald B. Marron Jr.

Donald Baird Marron (July 21, 1934 – December 6, 2019) was an American billionaire businessman, investment banker, investor, and philanthropist. He was chairman and chief executive officer of brokerage firm Paine Webber from 1980 to 2000, and the founder of private equity firm Lightyear Capital and of Data Resources Inc. He was the father of the economist Donald B. Marron Jr.

== Career ==
=== D.B. Marron & Company ===
In 1959, Marron founded D.B. Marron & Company. In 1965, Marron sold his company to Mitchell Hutchins and in 1967 was named president of the company.

=== Mitchell, Hutchins & Co. ===
Mitchell, Hutchins & Co. was a leading equity research boutique in the U.S., ranked the number 3 firm by Institutional Investor in 1974. In 1975, a national poll of portfolio managers chose the institutional brokerage firm as the “best research house on Wall Street.” Under Marron's leadership, the firm grew to be known as "one of Wall Street's premier stock research firms."

In 1977, Mitchell Hutchins was acquired by Paine Webber. PaineWebber continued to use the Mitchell Hutchins brand until the company's sale to UBS in 2000. In 2001, the Mitchell Hutchins name was discontinued when it was merged as a subsidiary with UBS's Brinson Partners division.

=== Data Resources Inc. ===
In 1969 Marron co-founded Data Resources Inc. with Harvard University notable economist Otto Eckstein. DRI became the largest non-governmental source of economic data and, working with Eckstein's theory of core inflation, developed the largest macroeconomic model of its era. Data Resources is credited with "breaking new ground for the practical use of economics" among business executives and others. The company went public in 1976, with 52 of the nation's 100 largest industrial corporations as clients. The company was sold to McGraw-Hill in 1979 for $103 million.

=== Paine Webber ===
PaineWebber Group was one of the nation's leading full-service investment firms, serving its global client base through its primary businesses of banking, retail sales, capital transactions, and asset management. In 1977, PaineWebber merged with Mitchell, Hutchins & Co., and Marron was named President of PaineWebber. In 1980, Marron was named PaineWebber's Chief Executive Officer, and in 1981, he was named chairman of the Board of PaineWebber, roles he would hold for the next two decades. During his tenure, Marron transformed the business into a leading wealth management and institutional investment firm.

In 2000, as CEO, Marron engineered the sale of PaineWebber to UBS AG. The deal valued PaineWebber's outstanding share capital at $10.8 billion, representing an estimated 47 percent premium over PaineWebber's closing price the day prior to the deal's announcement, and a multiple of 18.1 times the company's estimated 2000 earnings at the time. The deal had the support of PaineWebber's major shareholders.

PaineWebber's sale to UBS AG expanded UBS's presence in the U.S. wealth management market. The deal was described as one of the most successful transactions of its time, having reached a record sale price and delivering clear benefits to shareholders, clients and employees of both companies. Marron served as Chairman of UBS America from 2000 to 2003.

=== Lightyear Capital ===
In 2000, Marron founded Lightyear Capital, a private equity firm focused on investments in financial services companies. The firm has raised approximately $3.5 billion since inception across its four funds. In May 2002, Lightyear closed on its first fund, The Lightyear Fund, with $750 million of investor commitments, approximately $500 million of which came from UBS AG. In 2007, the firm completed fundraising for its second private equity fund, with $850 million of commitments from over 40 investors. In 2012, the firm closed its third fund valued at $954 million. In late 2017, the firm closed its fourth fund with more than $950 million.

=== Art collector ===
Marron was one of America's most recognized private art collectors, having supported international artists and cultural institutions for more than 40 years. His collection of post-war works spanning both the 20th and 21st centuries is inspired by his personal response to art and his conviction that good contemporary art reflects—and great art anticipates—societal trends.

Under Marron's five-year term as President of the Museum of Modern Art's Board of Trustees in the late 1980s, the Museum's endowment more than doubled, growing from $26 million in 1985 to $59 million in 1990. As a Trustee, Marron oversaw the first expansion of the Museum Tower in 1984, in which MoMA more than doubled its gallery footprint, increased its curatorial department by 30 percent, and added an auditorium, two restaurants and a bookstore. MoMA's atrium is named the Donald B. and Catherine C. Marron Atrium, for Marron and his wife, in recognition of their contributions to the Museum's significant expansion efforts. He remained on the Board of Trustees through at least 2018.

While at PaineWebber, Marron personally directed the firm's acquisition of more than 850 post-1945 works by major American and European artists—including Jasper Johns, Roy Lichtenstein, Willem de Kooning, and Susan Rothenberg, among many others—to create the PaineWebber Collection. In 2002, UBS PaineWebber promised MoMA 37 works, including paintings, drawings and sculpture by Andy Warhol (including Cagney, 1962), Roy Lichtenstein, Lucian Freud, and Jasper Johns. The donation was to be made over 15 years and was completed in 2017.

=== Non-profit and philanthropic work ===
In 2013, Marron provided the founding donation to launch the New York University (NYU) Marron Institute of Urban Management. The Marron Institute operates on an academic venture capital model and works with cities to improve health, safety, mobility and inclusiveness. The Marron Institute is dedicated to working with residents, officials and practitioners to address pressing challenges on issues such as city planning, criminal justice and environmental health.

In 2012, Marron and Memorial Sloan Kettering Cancer Center established the Donald B. and Catherine C. Marron Cancer Metabolism Center to promote intensive studies focused on tumor metabolism. A key aspect of the center is the Cell Metabolism Laboratory, which is a state-of-the-art facility that helps investigators characterize biological systems through direct measurement of the small molecule constituents.

== Board memberships and other affiliations ==
Current

- Museum of Modern Art - President Emeritus and Lifetime Trustee
- New York University (NYU) - Life Trustee
- NYU Marron Institute of Urban Management - Founding Donor
- Memorial Sloan Kettering Cancer Center's Board of Overseers - Member
- Council on Foreign Relations - Member
- Partnership for New York City - Member
- Center for Strategic and International Studies (CSIS) - Trustee
- Coalition for the Homeless - Donor
- Center for the Study of the Presidency & Congress - Chairman Emeritus

Former

- Securities Industry Association (SIA) - Governor and Vice Chairman (1974–1977)
- New York Stock Exchange (NYSE) - Member of the Board of Directors (1974–81)
- Dana Foundation - Director (1978–2007)
- PaineWebber (as Chairman, 1981–2001)
- National Association of Securities Dealers (NASD) - Governor (1997–2001)
- Shinsei Bank - Director (1999–2005)
- Fannie Mae - Member of the Board (2001–06)
- President's Committee on the Arts and Humanities - Member (Former)
- California Institute of the Arts (CalArts) - Vice Chairman of the Board (Former)

== Education ==
- Bronx High School of Science (January 1950)
- Attended Baruch College

== Personal life ==
Marron was married to Catherine "Catie" C. Marron, whose career has encompassed investment banking, magazine journalism, and public service. Mrs. Marron is currently chairman of the Board of Directors of the Friends of the High Line, a trustee of the New York Public Library—where she was chairman of the board for seven years—and a contributing editor to Vogue magazine. She is the creator and editor of City Parks (2013) and City Squares (2016), both published by HarperCollins.

Marron died of a heart attack on December 6, 2019, while on his way to a work party in New York City. He was 85.
