= Allen Sinai =

International Banker

Allen Sinai is the Chief Global Economist, Strategist and President at Decision Economics, Inc. He won the Top Forecaster-Wall Street Journal Survey in 2006, as well as the USA Today Survey Top Forecaster in 2003 and 2005. Sinai has worked with policymakers across the globe, including in the United States, Japan, Europe and Asia. He is listed as an event speaker with the Milken Institute.

== Education ==
- BA 1961, University of Michigan
- MA 1966, Northwestern University
- PhD 1969, Northwestern University
