= Wharton Econometric Forecasting Associates =

American economic consulting organization

- Industry: Economic forecasting and consulting
- Founded: 1969
- Headquarters: Philadelphia, Pennsylvania, United States,
- Key people: Lawrence R. Klein, Michael D. McCarthy

Wharton Econometric Forecasting Associates, Inc (WEFA Inc) was an economics forecasting and consulting organization founded by Nobel Prize winner Lawrence Klein.

WEFA Inc was a spinoff of the Wharton School of the University of Pennsylvania, where Klein taught. WEFA Inc traced an interesting path (see below for full details) from its predecessor in 1961 (the Economic Research Unit, discussed below), its initial launch in 1969 (as Wharton Econometric Forecasting Associates Inc), to its ultimate merger with DRI (formerly Data Resources Inc.) forming Global Insight in 2001, and subsequent to that, Global Insight's acquisition in 2008 by IHS Inc.

== Origins ==
Incorporated in 1969 by the Trustees of the University of Pennsylvania as a "not for profit" organization, WEFA Inc was an outgrowth of the Economics Research Unit (ERU) located in the economics department of the University of Pennsylvania. The ERU, a research unit devoted to graduate economics education, was originally sponsored in 1961 by grants from five US corporations including, IBM, Bethlehem Steel, John Deere, Exxon and Sunoco.

Among other things, the ERU was originally charged with the maintenance and use of the Wharton Quarterly Model [WQM] and the Wharton Index of Capacity Utilization. Between 1961 and 1969 the number of sponsors increased to the point where a more efficient organization was needed [WEFA Inc] to manage the many projects that grew out of the operation of the Wharton Quarterly Model.

== Leadership ==
In June 1969, when WEFA Inc was incorporated, Lawrence R. Klein was appointed board chairman, Michael D. McCarthy was appointed executive director, and the then Director of the ERU, F. G. Adams, was appointed secretary-treasurer. Other members of the Board were: The Dean of the Wharton School of Finance and Commerce at the University of Pennsylvania, ex officio, The Chairman of the Department of Economics of the University of Pennsylvania, ex officio, Paul F. Miller, (Board of Trustees of the University of Pennsylvania), Michael K. Evans (University of Pennsylvania, economics department), Paul Taubman (University of Pennsylvania, economics department), and Richard J. Kruizenga,(Chief Economist and Manager, Corporate and Environmental Economics, Standard Oil Co. of New Jersey).

Michael D. McCarthy served as executive director from June 1969 to December 1970. After joining WEFA Inc as Director of Industrial Research in August 1969, Ross S. Preston was appointed a board member and executive director of WEFA Inc in December 1970.

Preston served as executive director until the spring of 1975, at which time he was appointed secretary-treasurer of WEFA Inc. During Preston's tenure as executive director, WEFA Inc not only expanded its sponsorship of the Wharton Quarterly Model [WQM], but also developed the Wharton Annual and Industry Forecasting Model [WAIFM] which integrated input-output theory within the structure of a macro-econometric model. The predecessor of WAIFM was the Brookings Quarterly Model, originally funded by the Social Science Research Council.

The LINK project (also housed at WEFA Inc), which produced the world's first global macroeconomic model, was mentioned in Klein's citation for the Nobel Memorial Prize in Economic Sciences in 1980.

== Distribution rights ==
The various organization which acquired the rights to distribute WQM and WAIFM include:

- 1961-69 Economics Research Unit (University of Pennsylvania) distributes the Wharton Quarterly Model;
- 1969 University of Pennsylvania Board of Trustees (WEFA Inc is incorporated and takes over distribution of the Wharton Quarterly Model);
- 1969 WEFA Inc begins distribution of the Wharton Annual and Industry Forecasting Model;
- 1980 Ziff-Davis Publishing Co. acquires WEFA Inc;
- 1983 Cie International de Services en Informatique acquires WEFA Inc;
- 1986 WEF Associates AG acquires WEFA Inc;
- 1987 WEF Associates AG acquires Chase Econometrics, WEFA Inc becomes WEFA-CEIS;
- 1994 Information Partners (Bain Capital) acquires WEFA-CEIS;
- 1997 Primark Corporation acquires WEFA-CEIS;
- 2000 The Thomson Corporation acquires Primark Corporation;
- 2001 Global Insight acquires WEFA-CEIS from The Thomson Corporation and merges it with DRI;
- 2008 IHS Inc. acquires Global Insight.

== General corporate timeline ==
- June 13, 1969: Wharton Econometric Forecasting Associates is founded as a non-profit organization wholly owned by the Trustees of the University of Pennsylvania.
- July 14, 1979: McGraw-Hill announces it plans to buy Data Resources, a major competitor of Wharton Econometric Forecasting Associates for about $103 million.
- December 18, 1979: It is announced that University of Pennsylvania plans to sell its controlling interest in Wharton Econometric Forecasting Associates, and has held talks with three potential buyers.
- June 12, 1980: Ziff-Davis Publishing Co., a privately held publishing and broadcasting company, purchased Wharton Econometric Forecasting Associates Inc. from the University of Pennsylvania for an undisclosed amount. The University said it retained a minority interest. Ziff announced that Wharton Econometric Forecasting Associates would be the cornerstone of a new company, Strategic Information, which planned to spend tens of millions of dollars in the next five to six years to acquire state of the art computer equipment, according to Dennis O'Brien, who was named COO and Executive Vice President.
- March 18, 1983: Cie International de Services en Informatique (CISI), a computer firm owned by the French government, acquires an 80 percent interest in Wharton Econometrics from Ziff Davis Publishing Co, and an option to buy the remaining 20 percent in 1985. At the time, Wharton Econometrics is expected to generate revenue of US$8 million in 1983.
- June 20, 1983: CISI Wharton, part of the French CEA, announces plans to invest US$12 million over the next three years to position the newly enlarged entity as one of the world's leading economic forecasters.
- November 16, 1986: It is announced that WEF Associates, a group of European investors (the Salem family) advised by M Gerard Vila, would acquire CISI Wharton. At the time, CISI Wharton was described as having generated losses of FFr 100m in 1984-85 on revenue of FFr 94m, and employing 200 people.
- April 1, 1987: WEF Associates AG, the parent of Wharton Econometric Forecasting Associates, announced that it acquired Chase Econometrics from Chase Manhattan Bank N.A., a unit of Chase Manhattan Corp, and that the new entity would be called WEFA-CEIS, Wharton Consulting and Economic Consulting and Economic Information Services. Chase Econometrics had been founded by Michael Kaye Evans, who had previously collaborated with Klein at Wharton but parted ways. An earlier magazine article had described Wharton Econometrics as "austere and academic", Data Resources as "cerebral and expanding", and Chase as "outspoken and controversial". Lawrence Chimerine, chairman of Chase Econometrics, became chairman and CEO, of the new business, while Lawrence Klein was positioned to act as a consultant and continue to oversee the board.
- April 11, 1987: Wharton Econometrics and Chase Econometrics agreed to call the merged companies Wharton Economics rather than the originally proposed name, WEFA-CEIS. According to the CEO Lawrence Chimerin, the term "econometrics" was dropped, because the consolidated company would broaden its services from econometric modeling to areas such as financial analysis, planning support, and software development.
- August 2, 1994: Information Partners, a private investment group affiliated with Bain Capital and focused on investments and acquisitions in the information services marketplace, announced that it had completed the purchase of The WEFA Group. The transaction was later valued at US$20 million.
- January 16, 1997: Primark Corporation, headed by chairman and CEO Joseph E. Kasputys, announced it entered into an agreement to acquire WEFA Holdings Inc. from Bain Capital Inc. and other shareholders in a US$45 million cash transaction. According to Primark, WEFA had revenues of about US$29 million in 1996 and was profitable. It was also reported that in selling WEFA, Information Partners had earned a ninefold return on its August 1994 acquisition. In its press release, Primark said Allen Sinai was named to the new position as WEFA's chief global economist, and that William Mundell would continue as WEFA's president and chief executive.
- Early-1997 to June 1998: Primark holds discussions with several prospective buyers, including Reed Elsevier. Reed Elsevier withdrew its offer while it dealt with a possible merger with Wolters Kluwer.
- June 5, 2000: The Thomson Corporation announced that it would acquire Primark Corporation. At this point, Primark's key brands included A-T Financial Information, Baseline, Disclosure, Datastream, Global Access, GlobalTOPIC, I/B/E/S, MarketEye, PIMS, WEFA, Worldscope and Vestek. Thomson announced that it was looking at how it could integrate Primark's offerings with its own brands such as ILX and First Call. The deal came as a further sign of Thomson's moves to extract itself from some of its traditional operations such as small-circulation newspapers to move toward electronic-based business. It was announced that Thomson was acquiring Primark for approximately US$842 million, and the assumption of $235 million in Primark debt, while Primark had 1999 revenues of $495 million. Joseph E. Kasputys, Primark's Chairman and Chief Executive Officer, became Chairman of Thomson Financial.
- March 2001: Joseph Kasputys forms Global Insight, Inc. to be a leading company providing business executives, investors and government officials with economic information, analysis and solutions.
- May 7, 2001: Global Insight announced it would acquire DRI and WEFA from their respective parent companies to form its first subsidiary, DRI-WEFA Inc. DRI, formerly known as Data Resources Inc. was at this point a unit of The McGraw-Hill Companies, a New York publisher and financial services company, while WEFA was a unit of The Thomson Corporation, a Toronto diversified information company. Joseph Kasputys was the chairman and main shareholder in Global Insight and led the acquisition. At the time of the merger, Kasputys, who had previous roles as a senior executive of both WEFA and DRI, said that he had wanted to bring together DRI and WEFA since 1990. Kasputys had also been executive vice president of McGraw-Hill until 1987. At the point of the merger, WEFA had about 220 employees and DRI about 250. At its peak, DRI, the larger of the two, had brought in US$100 million in revenue. Including new subsidiaries Primark Decision Economics; DAFSA, a European market research company; and Primark Poland, a software development company; Global Insight was planned to employ about 500, have 30 offices world wide, and have annual revenue of $70 million.
- 2005: Global Insight reportedly generates revenue of US$86 million.
- September 18, 2008: Global Insight announces that it will be acquired by IHS Inc., a Colorado-based public company that supplies information on energy, the environment, security, and product life cycles. The acquisition closed on October 13, 2008 for US$165 million, consisting of $118 million in cash and IHS common stock valued at $47 million. In the announcement, Global Insight's 2008 revenues were reported at an estimated $120 million, with an adjusted EBITDA margin in the high single-digits. The deal anticipated the benefits of adding Global Insight to IHS' insight units, including Cambridge Energy Research Associates, Jane's Information Group, and IHS Herold's. At this point, Global Insight is renamed to IHS Global Insight and reportedly has 700 employees in 25 global offices.
