= Global Insight =

Economics forecasting organization

- IHS Global Insight logo
- Type: Division
- Founded: March 2001; 25 years ago
- Headquarters: Lexington, Massachusetts, US
- Number of employees: Over 700 in more than 14 countries
- Website: spglobal.com/marketintelligence/en/mi/industry/economics-country-risk.html

Global Insight is an economics forecasting organization, serving over 3,800 clients in industry, finance and government, with revenues of over $95 million (in 2006) and employing more than 600 staff in 23 offices in 13 countries. It is a division of S&P Global after its acquisition of IHS Inc.

== History ==
Global Insight was formed in March 2001 from the merger of WEFA (formerly Wharton Econometric Forecasting Associates) and DRI (formerly Data Resources Inc), together with Primark Decision Economics (later called Decision Economics, Inc.), Primark Poland (later GlobalInTech, sp. z o.o.) and the French company DAFSA; its estimated 2008 revenues were at $120 million. It has since acquired several other companies, including PlanEcon, CIEMEX, Reebie Associates, and London-based World Markets Research Centre. On November 2, 2007, Global Insight acquired SupplierBusiness.

== Ownership and management ==
Global Insight was privately held, and founded by Joseph E. Kasputys, who served as its president and CEO. On September 18, 2008, IHS Inc. agreed to purchase Global Insight for $200 million.

== See also ==
- Economy.com
