= Photovoltaics =

Method to produce electricity from solar radiation

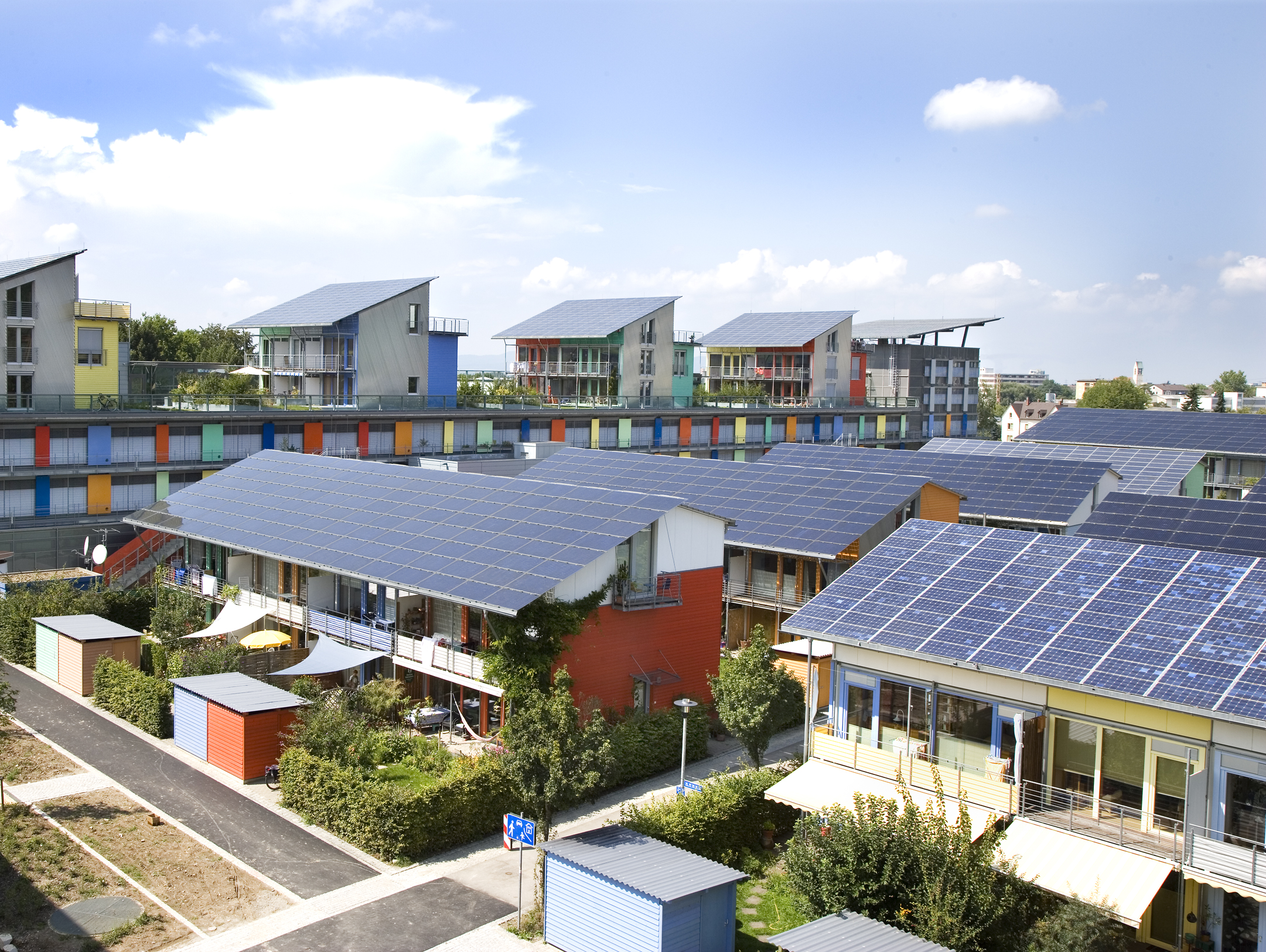
The Solar Settlement, a sustainable housing community project in Freiburg, Germany

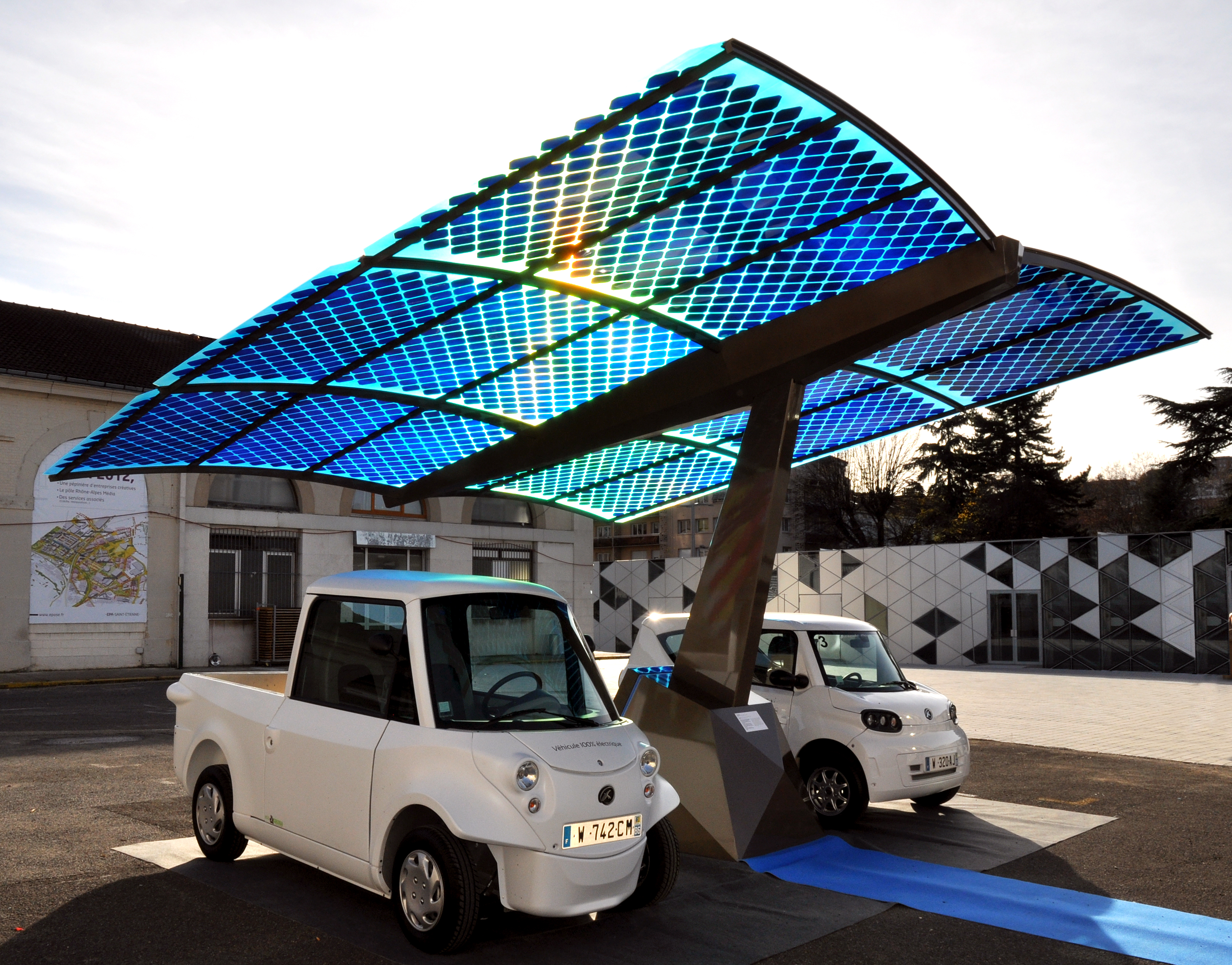
Charging station in France that provides energy for electric cars using solar energy

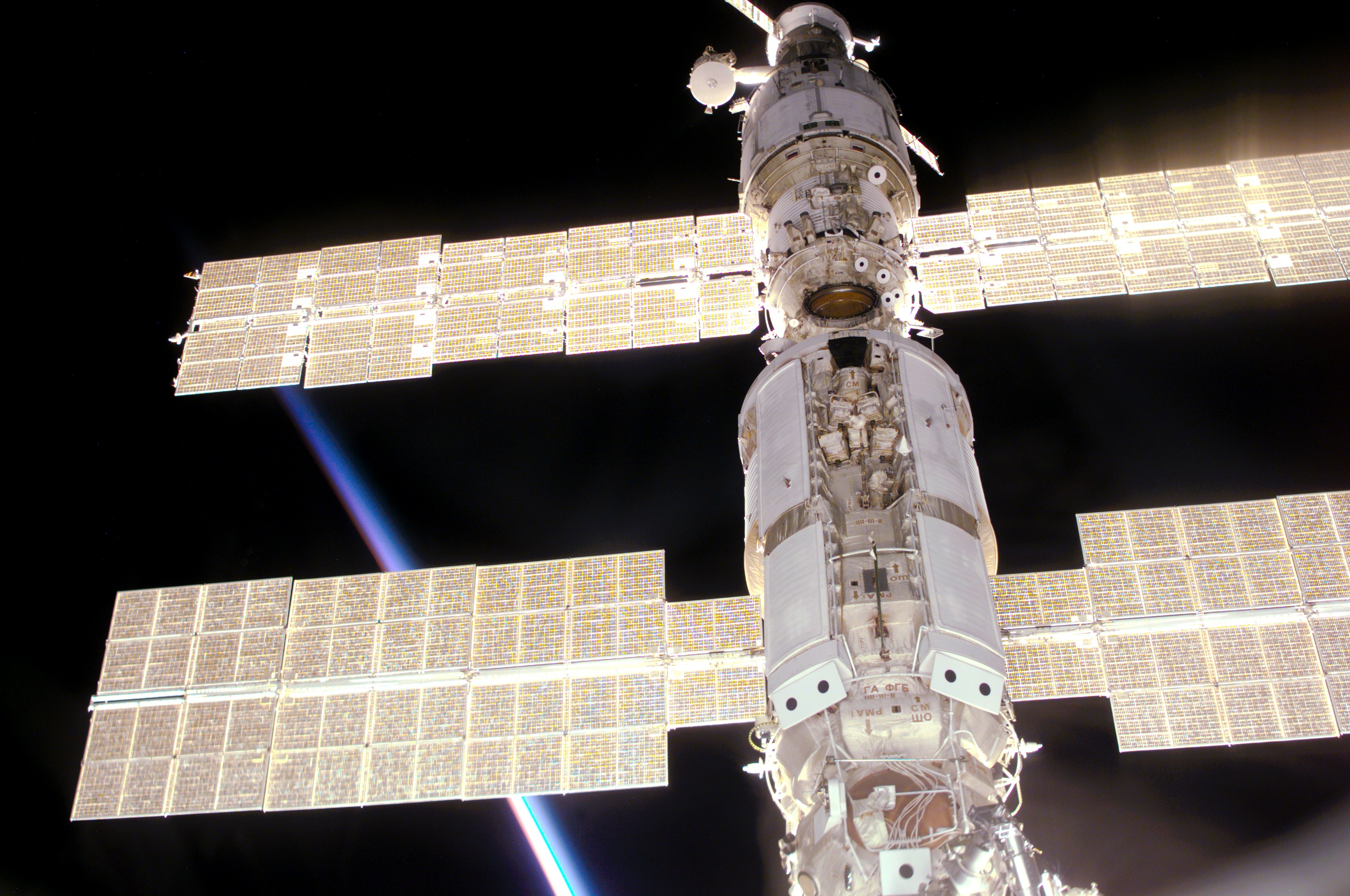
Solar panels on the International Space Station

Photovoltaics (PV) is the conversion of light into electricity using semiconducting materials that exhibit the photovoltaic effect, a phenomenon studied in physics, photochemistry, and electrochemistry. The photovoltaic effect is commercially used for electricity generation and as photosensors.

A photovoltaic system employs solar modules, each comprising a number of solar cells, which generate electrical power. PV installations may be ground-mounted, rooftop-mounted, wall-mounted or floating. The mount may be fixed or use a solar tracker to follow the sun across the sky.

Photovoltaic technology helps to mitigate climate change because it emits much less carbon dioxide than fossil fuels. Solar PV has specific advantages as an energy source: once installed, its operation does not generate any pollution or any greenhouse gas emissions; it shows scalability in respect of power needs and silicon has large availability in the Earth's crust, although other materials required in PV system manufacture such as silver may constrain further growth in the technology. Other major constraints identified include competition for land use. The use of PV as a main source requires energy storage systems or global distribution by high-voltage direct current power lines causing additional costs, and also has a number of other specific disadvantages such as variable power generation which have to be balanced. Production and installation does cause some pollution and greenhouse gas emissions, though only a fraction of the emissions caused by fossil fuels.

Photovoltaic systems have long been used in specialized applications as stand-alone installations and grid-connected PV systems have been in use since the 1990s. Photovoltaic modules were first mass-produced in 2000, when the German government funded a one hundred thousand roof program. Decreasing costs has allowed PV to grow as an energy source. This has been partially driven by massive Chinese government investment in developing solar production capacity since 2000, and achieving economies of scale. Improvements in manufacturing technology and efficiency have also led to decreasing costs. Net metering and financial incentives, such as preferential feed-in tariffs for solar-generated electricity, have supported solar PV installations in many countries. Panel prices dropped by a factor of 4 between 2004 and 2011. Module prices dropped by about 90% over the 2010s.

In 2022, worldwide installed PV capacity increased to more than 1 terawatt (TW) covering nearly two percent of global electricity demand. After hydro and wind powers, PV is the third renewable energy source in terms of global capacity. In 2022, the International Energy Agency expected a growth by over 1 TW from 2022 to 2027. In some instances, PV has offered the cheapest source of electrical power in regions with a high solar potential, with a bid for pricing as low as 0.015 US$/kWh in Qatar in 2023. In 2023, the International Energy Agency stated in its World Energy Outlook that '[f]or projects with low cost financing that tap high quality resources, solar PV is now the cheapest source of electricity in history.

== Etymology ==
The term "photovoltaic" comes from the Greek φῶς (phōs) meaning "light", and from "volt", the unit of electromotive force, the volt, which in turn comes from the last name of the Italian physicist Alessandro Volta, inventor of the battery (electrochemical cell). The term "photovoltaic" has been in use in English since 1849.

== History ==
In 1839, the French scientist Edmond Becquerel first observed the photovoltaic effect when he noted an electric current was produced by a metallic solution exposed to solar radiation.

In 1989, the German Ministry of Research and Technology initiated the first ever program to finance PV roofs. The program was led by Walter Sandtner in Bonn, Germany.

In 1994, Japan followed in their footsteps and conducted a similar program with 539 residential PV systems installed. Since then, many countries have continued to produce and finance PV systems.

== Solar cells ==
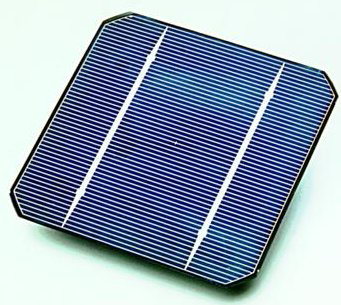
Solar cells generate electricity directly from sunlight.

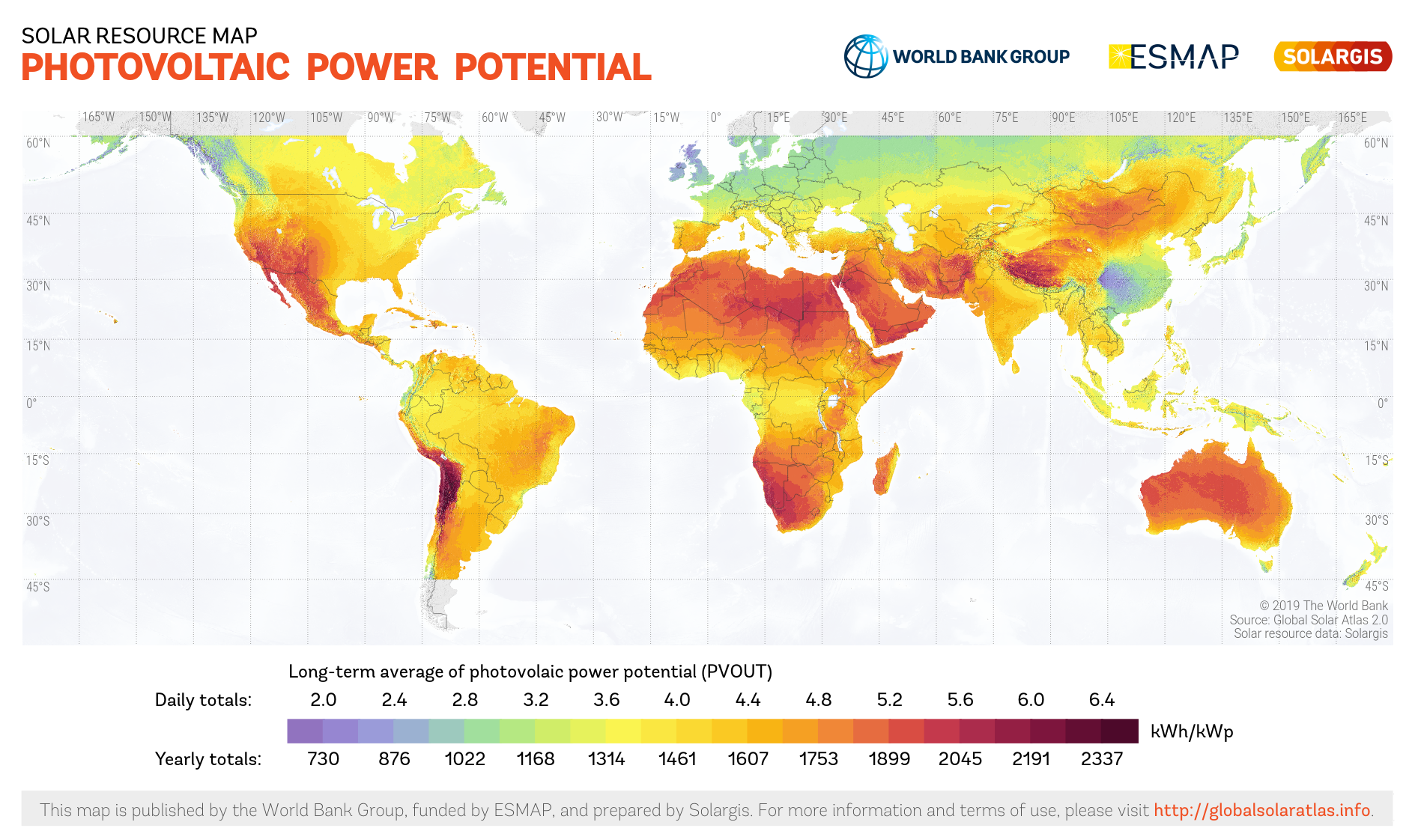
Photovoltaic power potential map estimates showing how many kWh of electricity can be produced from a 1 kWp free-standing c-Si modules, optimally inclined towards the Equator. The resulting long-term average is calculated based on weather data of at least 10 recent years.

Photovoltaics are best known as a method for generating electric power by using solar cells to convert energy from the sun into a flow of electrons by the photovoltaic effect.

Solar cells produce direct current electricity from sunlight which can be used to power equipment or to recharge batteries. The first practical application of photovoltaics was to power orbiting satellites and other spacecraft, but today the majority of photovoltaic modules are used for grid-connected systems for power generation. In this case an inverter is required to convert the DC to AC. There is also a smaller market for stand alone systems for remote dwellings, boats, recreational vehicles, electric cars, roadside emergency telephones, remote sensing, and cathodic protection of pipelines.

Photovoltaic power generation employs solar modules composed of a number of solar cells containing a semiconductor material. Copper solar cables connect modules (module cable), arrays (array cable), and sub-fields. Because of the growing demand for renewable energy sources, the manufacturing of solar cells and photovoltaic arrays has advanced considerably in recent years.

Cells require protection from the environment and are usually packaged tightly in solar modules.

Photovoltaic module power is measured under standard test conditions (STC) in "W_{p}" (watts peak). The actual power output at a particular place may be less than or greater than this rated value, depending on geographical location, time of day, weather conditions, and other factors. Solar photovoltaic array capacity factors are typically under 25% when not coupled with storage, which is lower than many other industrial sources of electricity.

=== Solar cell efficiencies ===
Solar cell efficiency is the portion of energy in sunlight that is converted into electricity by a solar cell. Efficiency, in combination with latitude and weather, determine the energy output of a solar system.

As of 2024, the record for solar cell efficiency was 47.6%, set in May 2022 by Fraunhofer ISE, with a III-V four-junction concentrating photovoltaic (CPV) cell. The record in real-world conditions is held by NREL, which developed triple junction cells with a tested efficiency of 39.5%.

Commercial solar modules may exceed 24% efficiency. As of 2025, the best reached 24.5%, typically lower than their cells in isolation. The most efficient mass-produced solar modules have power density values of 175 W/m^{2} (16.22 W/ft^{2}).

In 2026 using triple III-V germanium cells and shingled matrix technology to interconnect cells, Fraunhofer achieved efficiency of 34.4%. An important innovation was the use of direct cell-to-cell contact, eliminating traditional solder-coated copper ribbons and the resulting shading of active cell areas.

Schematic of charge collection by solar cells. Light transmits through transparent conducting electrode creating electron hole pairs, which are collected by both the electrodes. The absorption and collection efficiencies of a solar cell depend on the design of transparent conductors and active layer thickness.

Several factors affect conversion efficiency, including its reflectance, thermodynamic efficiency, charge carrier separation efficiency, charge carrier collection efficiency and conduction efficiency values. Because these parameters are difficult to directly measure, other parameters are measured instead, including quantum efficiency, open-circuit voltage (V_{OC}) ratio, and § Fill factor. Reflectance losses are accounted for by the quantum efficiency value, as they affect external quantum efficiency. Recombination losses are accounted for by these factors. Resistive losses are predominantly accounted for by the fill factor value, but also contribute to the others.

Depending on construction, photovoltaic modules can produce electricity from a range of frequencies of light, but usually cannot cover the entire solar radiation range (specifically, ultraviolet, visible, infrared and low or diffused light). Hence, much of the incident sunlight energy is not processed by solar modules. Theoretically, sunlight could be split into wavelength bands (each a different color), each directed onto cells tuned to those ranges that would convert that band more efficiently.

== Performance and degradation ==
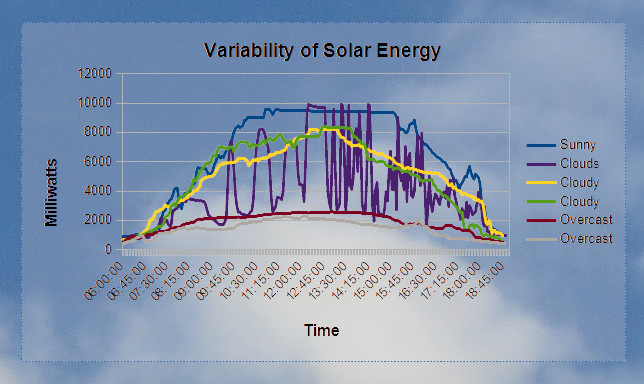
Chart illustrating the effect of clouds on solar energy production

Module performance is generally rated under standard test conditions (STC): irradiance of 1,000 W/m^{2}, solar spectrum of AM 1.5 and module temperature at 25 °C. The actual voltage and current output of the module changes as lighting, temperature and load conditions change, so there is never one specific voltage at which the module operates. Performance varies depending on geographic location, time of day, the day of the year, amount of solar irradiance, direction and tilt of modules, cloud cover, shading, soiling, state of charge, and temperature. Performance of a module or panel can be measured at different time intervals with a DC clamp meter or shunt and logged, graphed, or charted with a chart recorder or data logger.

For optimum performance, a solar panel needs to be made of similar modules oriented in the same direction perpendicular to direct sunlight. Bypass diodes are used to circumvent broken or shaded panels and optimize output. These bypass diodes are usually placed along groups of solar cells to create a continuous flow.

Electrical characteristics include nominal power (P_{MAX}, measured in W), open-circuit voltage (V_{OC}), short-circuit current (I_{SC}, measured in amperes), maximum power voltage (V_{MPP}), maximum power current (I_{MPP}), peak power (watt-peak, W_{p}), and module efficiency (%).

Open-circuit voltage or V_{OC} is the maximum voltage the module can produce when not connected to an electrical circuit or system. V_{OC} can be measured with a voltmeter directly on an illuminated module's terminals or on its disconnected cable.

The peak power rating, W_{p}, is the maximum output under standard test conditions (not the maximum possible output). Typical modules, which could measure approximately 1 by 2 metres (3 ft × 7 ft), will be rated from as low as 75 W to as high as 600 W, depending on their efficiency. At the time of testing, the test modules are binned according to their test results, and a typical manufacturer might rate their modules in 5 W increments, and either rate them at +/- 3%, +/-5%, +3/-0% or +5/-0%.

=== Degradation ===
The ability of solar modules to withstand damage by rain, hail, heavy snow load, and cycles of heat and cold varies by manufacturer, although most solar panels on the U.S. market are UL listed, meaning they have gone through testing to withstand hail.

Potential-induced degradation (also called PID) is a potential-induced performance degradation in crystalline photovoltaic modules, caused by so-called stray currents. This effect may cause power loss of up to 30%.

The largest challenge for photovoltaic technology is the purchase price per watt of electricity produced. Advancements in photovoltaic technologies have brought about the process of "doping" the silicon substrate to lower the activation energy thereby making the panel more efficient in converting photons to retrievable electrons.

Chemicals such as boron (p-type) are applied into the semiconductor crystal in order to create donor and acceptor energy levels substantially closer to the valence and conductor bands. In doing so, the addition of boron impurity allows the activation energy to decrease twenty-fold from 1.12 eV to 0.05 eV. Since the potential difference (E_{B}) is so low, the boron is able to thermally ionize at room temperatures. This allows for free energy carriers in the conduction and valence bands thereby allowing greater conversion of photons to electrons.

The power output of a photovoltaic (PV) device decreases over time. This decrease is due to its exposure to solar radiation as well as other external conditions. The degradation index, which is defined as the annual percentage of output power loss, is a key factor in determining the long-term production of a photovoltaic plant. To estimate this degradation, the percentage of decrease associated with each of the electrical parameters. The individual degradation of a photovoltaic module can significantly influence the performance of a complete string. Furthermore, not all modules in the same installation decrease their performance at exactly the same rate. Given a set of modules exposed to long-term outdoor conditions, the individual degradation of the main electrical parameters and the increase in their dispersion must be considered. As each module tends to degrade differently, the behavior of the modules will be increasingly different over time, negatively affecting the overall performance of the plant.

There are several studies dealing with the power degradation analysis of modules based on different photovoltaic technologies available in the literature. According to a recent study, the degradation of crystalline silicon modules is very regular, oscillating between 0.8% and 1.0% per year.

On the other hand, if we analyze the performance of thin-film photovoltaic modules, an initial period of strong degradation is observed (which can last several months and up to two years), followed by a later stage in which the degradation stabilizes, being then comparable to that of crystalline silicon. Strong seasonal variations are also observed in such thin-film technologies because the influence of the solar spectrum is much greater. For example, for modules of amorphous silicon, micromorphic silicon or cadmium telluride, we are talking about annual degradation rates for the first years of between 3% and 4%. However, other technologies, such as CIGS, show much lower degradation rates, even in those early years.

== Manufacturing of PV systems ==
Overall the manufacturing process of creating solar photovoltaics is simple in that it does not require the culmination of many complex or moving parts. Because of the solid-state nature of PV systems, they often have relatively long lifetimes, anywhere from 10 to 30 years. To increase the electrical output of a PV system, the manufacturer must simply add more photovoltaic components. Because of this, economies of scale are important for manufacturers as costs decrease with increasing output.

While there are many types of PV systems known to be effective, crystalline silicon PV accounted for around 90% of the worldwide production of PV in 2013. Manufacturing silicon PV systems has several steps. First, polysilicon is processed from mined quartz until it is very pure (semi-conductor grade). This is melted down with small amounts of boron, a group III element, to make a p-type semiconductor rich in electron holes. Typically using a seed crystal, an ingot of this solution is grown from the liquid polycrystalline. The ingot may also be cast in a mold. Wafers of this semiconductor material are cut from the bulk material with wire saws, and then go through surface etching before being cleaned. Next, the wafers are placed into a phosphorus vapor deposition furnace which lays a very thin layer of phosphorus, a group V element, which creates an n-type semiconducting surface. To reduce energy losses, an anti-reflective coating is added to the surface, along with electrical contacts. After finishing the cell, cells are connected via electrical circuit according to the specific application and prepared for shipping and installation.

=== Environmental costs of manufacture ===
Solar photovoltaic power is not entirely "clean energy": production produces greenhouse gas emissions, materials used to build the cells are potentially unsustainable and will run out eventually, the technology uses toxic substances which cause pollution, and there are no viable technologies for recycling solar waste. Data required to investigate their impact are sometimes affected by a rather large amount of uncertainty. The values of human labor and water consumption, for example, are not precisely assessed due to the lack of systematic and accurate analyses in the scientific literature. One difficulty in determining effects due to PV is to determine if the wastes are released to the air, water, or soil during the manufacturing phase. Life-cycle assessments, which look at all different environment effects ranging from global warming potential, pollution, water depletion and others, are unavailable for PV. Instead, studies have tried to estimate the impact and potential impact of various types of PV, but these estimates are usually restricted to simply assessing energy costs of the manufacture and/or transport, because these are new technologies and the total environmental impact of their components and disposal methods are unknown, even for commercially available first generation solar cells, let alone experimental prototypes with no commercial viability.

Thus, estimates of the environmental impact of PV have focused on carbon dioxide equivalents per kWh or energy pay-back time (EPBT). The EPBT describes the timespan a PV system needs to operate in order to generate the same amount of energy that was used for its manufacture. Another study includes transport energy costs in the EPBT. The EPBT has also been defined completely differently as "the time needed to compensate for the total renewable- and non-renewable primary energy required during the life cycle of a PV system" in another study, which also included installation costs. This energy amortization, given in years, is also referred to as break-even energy payback time. The lower the EPBT, the lower the environmental cost of solar power. The EPBT depends vastly on the location where the PV system is installed (e.g. the amount of sunlight available and the efficiency of the electrical grid) and on the type of system, namely the system's components.

A 2015 review of EPBT estimates of first and second-generation PV suggested that there was greater variation in embedded energy than in efficiency of the cells implying that it was mainly the embedded energy that needs to reduce to have a greater reduction in EPBT.

In general, the most important component of solar panels, which accounts for much of the energy use and greenhouse gas emissions, is the refining of the polysilicon. As to how much percentage of the EPBT this silicon depends on the type of system. A fully autarkic system requires additional components ('Balance of System', the power inverters, storage, etc.) which significantly increase the energy cost of manufacture, but in a simple rooftop system, some 90% of the energy cost is from silicon, with the remainder coming from the inverters and module frame.

The EPBT relates closely to the concepts of net energy gain (NEG) and energy returned on energy invested (EROI). They are both used in energy economics and refer to the difference between the energy expended to harvest an energy source and the amount of energy gained from that harvest. The NEG and EROI also take the operating lifetime of a PV system into account and a working life of 25 to 30 years is typically assumed. From these metrics, the Energy payback Time can be derived by calculation.

==== EPBT improvements ====
PV systems using crystalline silicon, by far the majority of the systems in practical use, have such a high EPBT because silicon is produced by the reduction of high-grade quartz sand in electric furnaces. This coke-fired smelting process occurs at high temperatures of more than 1000 °C and is very energy intensive, using about 11 kilowatt-hours (kWh) per produced kilogram of silicon. The energy requirements of this process makes the energy cost per unit of silicon produced relatively inelastic, which means that the production process itself will not become more efficient in the future.

Nonetheless, the energy payback time has shortened significantly over the last years, as crystalline silicon cells became ever more efficient in converting sunlight, while the thickness of the wafer material was constantly reduced and therefore required less silicon for its manufacture. Within the last ten years, the amount of silicon used for solar cells declined from 16 to 6 grams per watt-peak. In the same period, the thickness of a c-Si wafer was reduced from 300 μm, or microns, to about 160–190 μm. The sawing techniques that slice crystalline silicon ingots into wafers have also improved by reducing the kerf loss and making it easier to recycle the silicon sawdust.

Key parameters for material and energy efficiency
Parameter	Mono-Si	CdTe
Cell efficiency	16.5%	15.6%
Derate cell to module efficiency	8.5%	13.9%
Module efficiency	15.1%	13.4%
Wafer thickness / layer thickness	190 μm	4.0 μm
Kerf loss	190 μm	–
Silver per cell	9.6 g/m^{2}	–
Glass thickness	4.0 mm	3.5 mm
Operational lifetime	30 years	30 years
Source: IEA-PVPS, Life Cycle Assessment, March 2015

==== Effects from first generation PV ====
Crystalline silicon modules are the most extensively studied PV type in terms of LCA since they are the most commonly used. Mono-crystalline silicon photovoltaic systems (mono-si) have an average efficiency of 14.0%. The cells tend to follow a structure of front electrode, anti-reflection film, n-layer, p-layer, and back electrode, with the sun hitting the front electrode. EPBT ranges from 1.7 to 2.7 years. The cradle to gate of CO_{2}-eq/kWh ranges from 37.3 to 72.2 grams when installed in Southern Europe.

Techniques to produce multi-crystalline silicon (multi-si) photovoltaic cells are simpler and cheaper than mono-si, however tend to make less efficient cells, an average of 13.2%. EPBT ranges from 1.5 to 2.6 years. The cradle to gate of CO_{2}-eq/kWh ranges from 28.5 to 69 grams when installed in Southern Europe.

Assuming that the following countries had a high-quality grid infrastructure as in Europe, in 2020 it was calculated it would take 1.28 years in Ottawa, Canada, for a rooftop photovoltaic system to produce the same amount of energy as required to manufacture the silicon in the modules in it (excluding the silver, glass, mounts and other components), 0.97 years in Catania, Italy, and 0.4 years in Jaipur, India. Outside of Europe, where net grid efficiencies are lower, it would take longer. This 'energy payback time' can be seen as the portion of time during the useful lifetime of the module in which the energy production is polluting. At best, this means that a 30-year old panel has produced clean energy for 97% of its lifetime, or that the silicon in the modules in a solar panel produce 97% less greenhouse gas emissions than a coal-fired plant for the same amount of energy (assuming and ignoring many things). Some studies have looked beyond EPBT and GWP to other environmental effects. In one such study, conventional energy mix in Greece was compared to multi-si PV and found a 95% overall reduction in effects including carcinogens, eco-toxicity, acidification, eutrophication, and eleven others.

==== Impact from second generation PV ====
Cadmium telluride (CdTe) is one of the fastest-growing thin film based solar cells which are collectively known as second-generation devices. This new thin-film device also shares similar performance restrictions (Shockley–Queisser efficiency limit) as conventional Si devices but promises to lower the cost of each device by both reducing material and energy consumption during manufacturing. The global market share of CdTe was 4.7% in 2008. This technology's highest power conversion efficiency is 21%. The cell structure includes glass substrate (around 2 mm), transparent conductor layer, CdS buffer layer (50–150 nm), CdTe absorber and a metal contact layer.

CdTe PV systems require less energy input in their production than other commercial PV systems per unit electricity production. The average CO_{2}-eq/kWh is around 18 grams (cradle to gate). CdTe has the fastest EPBT of all commercial PV technologies, which varies between 0.3 and 1.2 years.

==== Effects from third generation PV ====
Third-generation PVs are designed to combine the advantages of both the first and second generation devices and they do not have Shockley–Queisser limit, a theoretical limit for first and second generation PV cells. The thickness of a third generation device is less than 1 μm.

Two new promising thin film technologies are copper zinc tin sulfide (Cu_{2}ZnSnS_{4} or CZTS), zinc phosphide (Zn_{3}P_{2}) and single-walled carbon nano-tubes (SWCNT). These thin films are currently only produced in the lab but may be commercialized in the future. The manufacturing of CZTS and (Zn_{3}P_{2}) processes are expected to be similar to those of current thin film technologies of CIGS and CdTe, respectively. While the absorber layer of SWCNT PV is expected to be synthesized with CoMoCAT method. by Contrary to established thin films such as CIGS and CdTe, CZTS, Zn_{3}P_{2}, and SWCNT PVs are made from earth abundant, nontoxic materials and have the potential to produce more electricity annually than the current worldwide consumption. While CZTS and Zn_{3}P_{2} offer good promise for these reasons, the specific environmental implications of their commercial production are not yet known. Global warming potential of CZTS and Zn_{3}P_{2} were found 38 and 30 grams CO_{2}-eq/kWh while their corresponding EPBT were found 1.85 and 0.78 years, respectively. Overall, CdTe and Zn_{3}P_{2} have similar environmental effects but can slightly outperform CIGS and CZTS. A study on environmental impacts of SWCNT PVs by Celik et al., including an existing 1% efficient device and a theoretical 28% efficient device, found that, compared to monocrystalline Si, the environmental impacts from 1% SWCNT was ~18 times higher due mainly to the short lifetime of three years.

== Economics ==
Source: Apricus

There have been major changes in the underlying costs, industry structure and market prices of solar photovoltaics technology, over the years, and gaining a coherent picture of the shifts occurring across the industry value chain globally is a challenge. This is due to: "the rapidity of cost and price changes, the complexity of the PV supply chain, which involves a large number of manufacturing processes, the balance of system (BOS) and installation costs associated with complete PV systems, the choice of different distribution channels, and differences between regional markets within which PV is being deployed". Further complexities result from the many different policy support initiatives that have been put in place to facilitate photovoltaics commercialisation in various countries.

Renewable energy technologies have generally gotten cheaper since their invention. Renewable energy systems have become cheaper to build than fossil fuel power plants across much of the world, thanks to advances in wind and solar energy technology, in particular.

- Implications for electricity bill management and energy investment

There is no silver bullet in electricity or energy demand and bill management, because customers (sites) have different specific situations, e.g. different comfort/convenience needs, different electricity tariffs, or different usage patterns. Electricity tariff may have a few elements, such as daily access and metering charge, energy charge (based on kWh, MWh) or peak demand charge (e.g. a price for the highest 30min energy consumption in a month). PV is a promising option for reducing energy charges when electricity prices are reasonably high and continuously increasing, such as in Australia and Germany. However, for sites with peak demand charge in place, PV may be less attractive if peak demands mostly occur in the late afternoon to early evening, for example in residential communities. Overall, energy investment is largely an economic decision and it is better to make investment decisions based on systematic evaluation of options in operational improvement, energy efficiency, onsite generation and energy storage.

=== Hardware costs ===
Swanson's law–stating that solar module prices have dropped about 20% for each doubling of installed capacity—defines the "learning rate" of solar photovoltaics.

In 1977 crystalline silicon solar cell prices were at $76.67/W.

Although wholesale module prices remained flat at around $3.50 to $4.00/W in the early 2000s due to high demand in Germany and Spain afforded by generous subsidies and shortage of polysilicon, demand crashed with the abrupt ending of Spanish subsidies after the market crash of 2008, and the price dropped rapidly to $2.00/W. Manufacturers were able to maintain a positive operating margin despite a 50% drop in income due to innovation and reductions in costs. In late 2011, factory-gate prices for crystalline-silicon photovoltaic modules suddenly dropped below the $1.00/W mark, taking many in the industry by surprise, and has caused a number of solar manufacturing companies to go bankrupt throughout the world. The $1.00/W cost is often regarded in the PV industry as marking the achievement of grid parity for PV, but most experts do not believe this price point is sustainable. Technological advancements, manufacturing process improvements, and industry re-structuring, may mean that further price reductions are possible. The average retail price of solar cells as monitored by the Solarbuzz group fell from $3.50/watt to $2.43/watt over the course of 2011. In 2013 wholesale prices had fallen to $0.74/W. This has been cited as evidence supporting 'Swanson's law', an observation similar to the famous Moore's Law, which claims that solar cell prices fall 20% for every doubling of industry capacity. The Fraunhofer Institute defines the 'learning rate' as the drop in prices as the cumulative production doubles, some 25% between 1980 and 2010. Although the prices for modules have dropped quickly, current inverter prices have dropped at a much lower rate, and in 2019 constitute over 61% of the cost per kWp, from a quarter in the early 2000s.

Note that the prices mentioned above are for bare modules, another way of looking at module prices is to include installation costs. In the US, according to the Solar Energy Industries Association, the price of installed rooftop PV modules for homeowners fell from $9.00/W in 2006 to $5.46/W in 2011. Including the prices paid by industrial installations, the national installed price drops to $3.45/W. This is markedly higher than elsewhere in the world, in Germany homeowner rooftop installations averaged at $2.24/W. The cost differences are thought to be primarily based on the higher regulatory burden and lack of a national solar policy in the US.

By the end of 2012 Chinese manufacturers had production costs of $0.50/W in the cheapest modules. In some markets distributors of these modules can earn a considerable margin, buying at factory-gate price and selling at the highest price the market can support ('value-based pricing'). In California PV reached grid parity in 2011, which is usually defined as PV production costs at or below retail electricity prices (though often still above the power station prices for coal or gas-fired generation without their distribution and other costs). Grid parity had been reached in 19 markets in 2014.

By 2024, massive increases of production of solar panels in China had caused module prices to drop to as low as $0.11/W, an over 90 percent reduction from 2011 prices.

=== Levelised cost of electricity ===
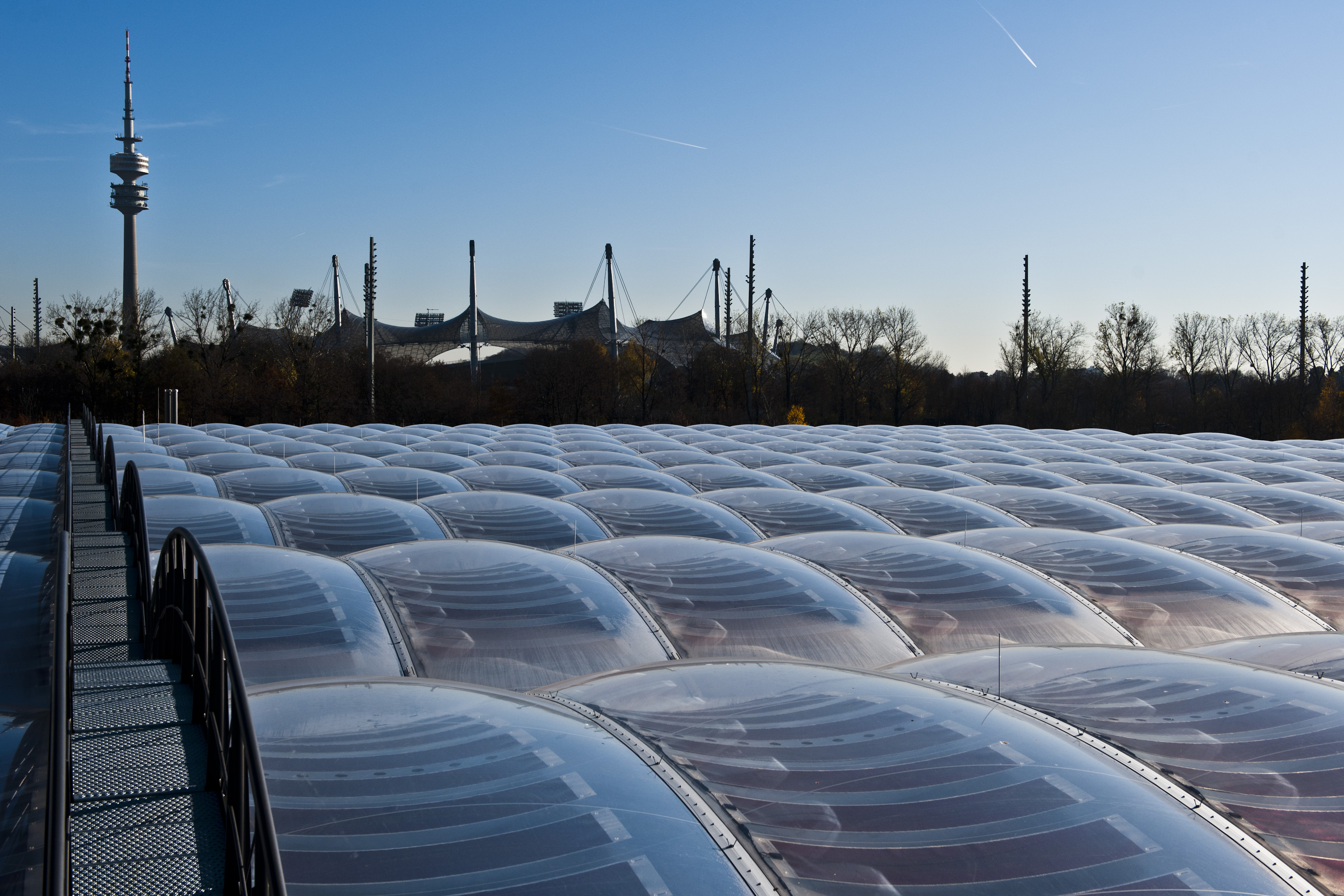
AWM Munich ETFE Cushions-Photovoltaics

The levelised cost of electricity (LCOE) is the cost per kWh based on the costs distributed over the project lifetime, and is thought to be a better metric for calculating viability than price per wattage. LCOEs vary dramatically depending on the location. The LCOE can be considered the minimum price customers will have to pay the utility company in order for it to break even on the investment in a new power station. Grid parity is roughly achieved when the LCOE falls to a similar price as conventional local grid prices, although in actuality the calculations are not directly comparable. Large industrial PV installations had reached grid parity in California in 2011. Grid parity for rooftop systems was still believed to be much farther away at this time. Many LCOE calculations are not thought to be accurate, and a large amount of assumptions are required. Module prices may drop further, and the LCOE for solar may correspondingly drop in the future.

Because energy demands rise and fall over the course of the day, and solar power is limited by the fact that the sun sets, solar power companies must also factor in the additional costs of supplying a more stable alternative energy supplies to the grid in order to stabilize the system, or storing the energy. These costs are not factored into LCOE calculations, nor are special subsidies or premiums that may make buying solar power more attractive. The unreliability and temporal variation in generation of solar and wind power is a major problem. Too much of these volatile power sources can cause instability of the entire grid.

As of 2017 power-purchase agreement prices for solar farms below $0.05/kWh are common in the United States, and the lowest bids in some Persian Gulf countries were about $0.03/kWh. The goal of the United States Department of Energy is to achieve a levelised cost of energy for solar PV of $0.03/kWh for utility companies.

=== Subsidies and financing ===
Financial incentives for photovoltaics, such as feed-in tariffs (FITs), were often offered to electricity consumers to install and operate solar-electric generating systems, and in some countries such subsidies are the only way photovoltaics can remain economically profitable. PV FITs were crucial for early growth of photovoltaics. Germany and Spain were the most important countries offering subsidies for PV, and the policies of these countries drove demand.

Some US solar cell manufacturing companies have repeatedly complained that the dropping prices of PV module costs have been achieved due to subsidies by the government of China, and the dumping of these products below fair market prices. US manufacturers generally recommend high tariffs on foreign supplies to allow them remain profitable. In response to these concerns, the Obama administration began to levy tariffs on US consumers of these products in 2012 to raise prices for domestic manufacturers. The USA, however, also subsidies the industry.

Some environmentalists have promoted the idea that government incentives should be used in order to expand the PV manufacturing industry to reduce costs of PV-generated electricity much more rapidly to a level where it is able to compete with fossil fuels in a free market. This is based on the theory that when the manufacturing capacity doubles, economies of scale will cause the prices of the solar products to halve.

In many countries access to capital is lacking to develop PV projects. To solve this problem, securitization is sometimes used to accelerate development of solar photovoltaic projects.

=== Other ===
Photovoltaic power is also generated during a time of day that is close to peak demand (precedes it) in electricity systems with high use of air conditioning. Since large-scale PV operation requires back-up in the form of spinning reserves, its marginal cost of generation in the middle of the day is typically lowest, but not zero, when PV is generating electricity. This can be seen in Figure 1 of this paper:. For residential properties with private PV facilities networked to the grid, the owner may be able earn extra money when the time of generation is included, as electricity is worth more during the day than at night.

One journalist theorised in 2012 that if the energy bills of Americans were forced upwards by imposing an extra tax of $50/ton on carbon dioxide emissions from coal-fired power, this could have allowed solar PV to appear more cost-competitive to consumers in most locations.

== Growth ==
Solar and wind power are scaling up faster than previous sources of electricity. Declining costs, modular design, and improved battery storage help the transition to renewable energy, especially for solar.

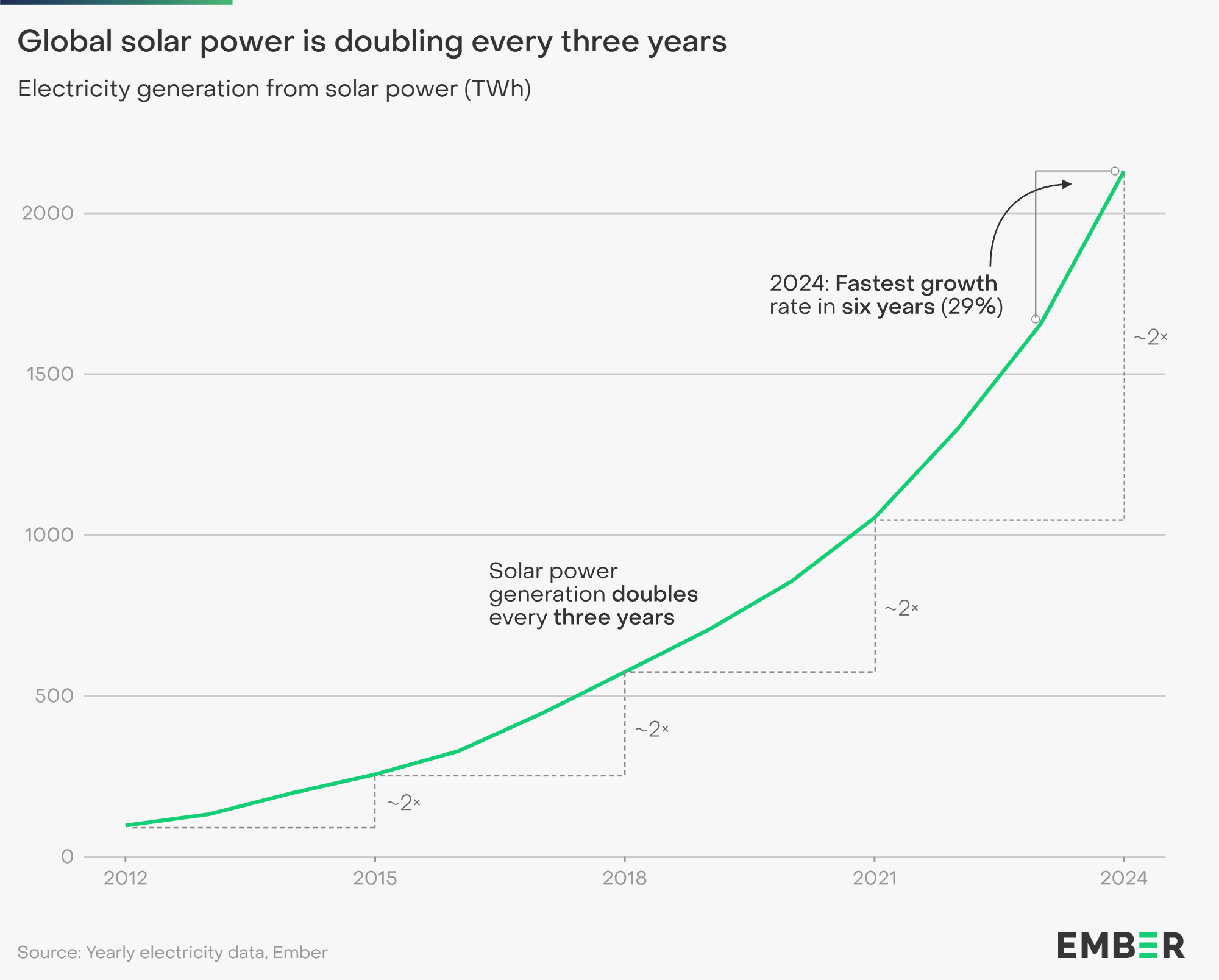
Accelerating growth of solar power generation (in TWh)

Solar photovoltaics formed the largest body of research among the seven sustainable energy types examined in a global bibliometric study, with the annual scientific output growing from 9,094 publications in 2011 to 14,447 publications in 2019. Likewise, the application of solar photovoltaics is growing rapidly and the worldwide installed capacity reached one terawatt in April 2022. The total power output of the world's PV capacity in a calendar year is now beyond 500 TWh of electricity. This represents 2% of worldwide electricity demand. More than 100 countries, such as Brazil and India, use solar PV. China is followed by the United States and Japan, while installations in Germany, once the world's largest producer, have been slowing down.

Honduras generated the highest percentage of its energy from solar in 2019, 14.8%. As of 2019, Vietnam has the highest installed capacity in Southeast Asia, about 4.5 GW. The annualized installation rate of about 90 W per capita per annum places Vietnam among world leaders. Generous Feed-in tariff (FIT) and government supporting policies such as tax exemptions were the key to enable Vietnam's solar PV boom. Underlying drivers include the government's desire to enhance energy self-sufficiency and the public's demand for local environmental quality.

A key barrier is limited transmission grid capacity.

China has the world's largest solar power capacity, with 1048 GW of installed capacity in 2024 compared with about 339 GW in the European Union, according to International Energy Agency data. Other countries with the world's largest solar power capacities include the United States, Japan and Germany.

Top 20 PV countries in 2022 (MW)

Installed and total solar power capacity in 2022 (MW)
#	Nation	Total capacity	Added capacity
1	China	393,000	86,100
2	United States	113,000	17,800
3	Japan	78,800	4,600
4	Germany	66,600	8,100
5	India	63,100	13,500
6	Australia	26,800	7,700
7	Italy	25,100	2,400
8	Brazil	24,100	9,900
9	South Korea	21,000	2,800
10	Spain	20,500	4,600
11	Netherlands	19,100	4,200
12	Vietnam	18,500	1,800
13	France	17,400	2,700
14	United Kingdom	14,400	720
15	Poland	11,200	4,900
16	Taiwan	9,700	2,000
17	Turkey	9,400	1,600
18	Mexico	9,000	2,000
19	Ukraine	8,100	0
20	Belgium	6,900	310

Data: IEA-PVPS Snapshot of Global PV Markets 2023 report, April 2023
Also see Solar power by country for a complete and continuously updated list

In 2017, it was thought probable that by 2030 global PV installed capacities could be between 3,000 and 10,000 GW. Greenpeace in 2010 claimed that 1,845 GW of PV systems worldwide could be generating approximately 2,646 TWh/year of electricity by 2030, and by 2050 over 20% of all electricity could be provided by PV.

== Applications ==
There are many practical applications for the use of solar panels or photovoltaics covering every technological domain under the sun. From the fields of the agricultural industry as a power source for irrigation to its usage in remote health care facilities to refrigerate medical supplies. Other applications include power generation at various scales and attempts to integrate them into homes and public infrastructure. PV modules are used in photovoltaic systems and include a large variety of electrical devices.

=== Photovoltaic systems ===
A photovoltaic system, or solar PV system is a power system designed to supply usable solar power by means of photovoltaics. It consists of an arrangement of several components, including solar panels to absorb and directly convert sunlight into electricity, a solar inverter to change the electric current from DC to AC, as well as mounting, cabling and other electrical accessories. PV systems range from small, roof-top mounted or building-integrated systems with capacities from a few to several tens of kilowatts, to large utility-scale power stations of hundreds of megawatts. Nowadays, most PV systems are grid-connected, while stand-alone systems only account for a small portion of the market.

=== Photo sensors ===
Photosensors are sensors of light or other electromagnetic radiation. A photo detector has a p–n junction that converts light photons into current. The absorbed photons make electron–hole pairs in the depletion region. Photodiodes and photo transistors are a few examples of photo detectors. Solar cells convert some of the light energy absorbed into electrical energy.

== Experimental technology ==
Crystalline silicon photovoltaics are only one type of PV, and while they represent the majority of solar cells produced currently there are many new and promising technologies that have the potential to be scaled up to meet future energy needs. As of 2018, crystalline silicon cell technology serves as the basis for several PV module types, including monocrystalline, multicrystalline, mono PERC, and bifacial.

Another newer technology, thin-film PV, are manufactured by depositing semiconducting layers of perovskite, a mineral with semiconductor properties, on a substrate in vacuum. The substrate is often glass or stainless-steel, and these semiconducting layers are made of many types of materials including cadmium telluride (CdTe), copper indium diselenide (CIS), copper indium gallium diselenide (CIGS), and amorphous silicon (a-Si). After being deposited onto the substrate the semiconducting layers are separated and connected by electrical circuit by laser scribing. Perovskite solar cells are a very efficient solar energy converter and have excellent optoelectronic properties for photovoltaic purposes, but their upscaling from lab-sized cells to large-area modules is still under research. Thin-film photovoltaic materials may possibly become attractive in the future, because of the reduced materials requirements and cost to manufacture modules consisting of thin-films as compared to silicon-based wafers. In 2019 university labs at Oxford, Stanford and elsewhere reported perovskite solar cells with efficiencies of 20–25%.

=== CIGS ===
Copper indium gallium selenide (CIGS) is a thin film solar cell based on the copper indium diselenide (CIS) family of chalcopyrite semiconductors. CIS and CIGS are often used interchangeably within the CIS/CIGS community. The cell structure includes soda lime glass as the substrate, Mo layer as the back contact, CIS/CIGS as the absorber layer, cadmium sulfide (CdS) or Zn (S,OH)x as the buffer layer, and ZnO:Al as the front contact. CIGS is approximately 1/100 the thickness of conventional silicon solar cell technologies. Materials necessary for assembly are readily available, and are less costly per watt of solar cell. CIGS based solar devices resist performance degradation over time and are highly stable in the field.

Reported global warming potential impacts of CIGS ranges 20.5–58.8 grams CO_{2}-eq/kWh of electricity generated for different solar irradiation (1,700 to 2,200 kWh/m^{2}/y) and power conversion efficiency (7.8 – 9.12%). EPBT ranges from 0.2 to 1.4 years, while harmonized value of EPBT was found 1.393 years. Toxicity is an issue within the buffer layer of CIGS modules because it contains cadmium and gallium. CIS modules do not contain any heavy metals.

=== Perovskite solar cells ===
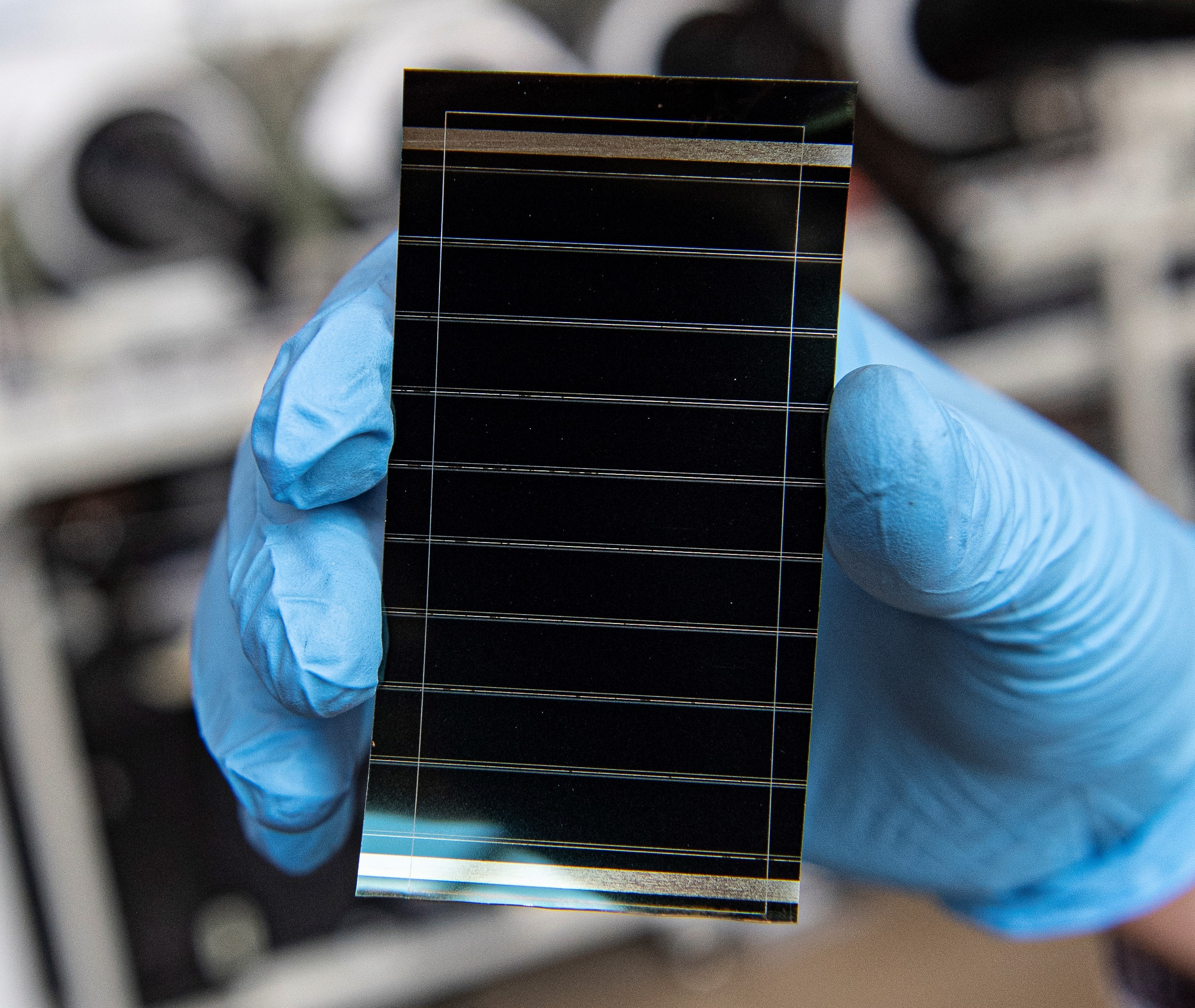
A perovskite solar cell

A perovskite solar cell (PSC) is a type of solar cell that includes a perovskite-structured compound, most commonly a hybrid organic–inorganic lead or tin halide-based material as the light-harvesting active layer. Perovskite materials, such as methylammonium lead halides and the all-inorganic cesium lead halide, are cheap to produce and simple to manufacture.

Solar-cell efficiencies of laboratory-scale devices using these materials have increased from 3.8% in 2009 to 27% in 2025 in single-junction architectures, and, in silicon-based tandem cells, to 34.85%, exceeding the maximum efficiency achieved in single-junction silicon solar cells. Perovskite solar cells have therefore been the fastest-advancing solar technology as of 2016. With the potential of achieving even higher efficiencies and very low production costs, perovskite solar cells have become commercially attractive. Core problems and research subjects include their long-term stability, high sensitivity to moisture, and toxicity if lead is used. Managing toxic lead in PSCs is essential, as exposure presents significant health risks, including neurological disorders. Because PSCs are an emerging technology, lead toxicity remains a major hurdle to widespread adoption and commercialization.

=== Dye-Sensitized Solar Cells ===
Dye-sensitized solar cells (DSCs) are a novel thin film solar cell. These solar cells operate under ambient light better than other photovoltaic technologies. They work with light being absorbed in a sensitizing dye between two charge transport materials. Dye surrounds TiO_{2} nanoparticles which are in a sintered network. TiO_{2} acts as conduction band in an n-type semiconductor; the scaffold for adorned dye molecules and transports elections during excitation. For TiO_{2} DSC technology, sample preparation at high temperatures is very effective because higher temperatures produce more suitable textural properties. Another example of DSCs is the copper complex with Cu (II/I) as a redox shuttle with TMBY (4,4',6,6'-tetramethyl-2,2'bipyridine). DSCs show great performance with artificial and indoor light. From a range of 200 lux to 2,000 lux, these cells operate at conditions of a maximum efficiency of 29.7%.

However, there have been issues with DSCs, many of which come from the liquid electrolyte. The solvent is hazardous, and will permeate most plastics. Because it is liquid, it is unstable to temperature variation, leading to freezing in cold temperatures and expansion in warm temperatures causing failure. Another disadvantage is that the solar cell is not ideal for large scale application because of its low efficiency. Some of the benefits for DSC is that it can be used in a variety of light levels (including cloudy conditions), it has a low production cost, and it does not degrade under sunlight, giving it a longer lifetime then other types of thin film solar cells.

=== OPV ===
Other possible future PV technologies include organic, dye-sensitized and quantum-dot photovoltaics. Organic photovoltaics (OPVs) fall into the thin-film category of manufacturing, and typically operate around the 12% efficiency range which is lower than the 12–21% typically seen by silicon-based PVs. Because organic photovoltaics require very high purity and are relatively reactive they must be encapsulated which vastly increases the cost of manufacturing and means that they are not feasible for large scale-up. Dye-sensitized PVs are similar in efficiency to OPVs but are significantly easier to manufacture. However, these dye-sensitized photovoltaics present storage problems because the liquid electrolyte is toxic and can potentially permeate the plastics used in the cell. Quantum dot solar cells are solution-processed, meaning they are potentially scalable, but currently they peak at 12% efficiency.

Organic and polymer photovoltaic (OPV) are a relatively new area of research. The tradition OPV cell structure layers consist of a semi-transparent electrode, electron blocking layer, tunnel junction, holes blocking layer, electrode, with the sun hitting the transparent electrode. OPV replaces silver with carbon as an electrode material lowering manufacturing cost and making them more environmentally friendly. OPV are flexible, low weight, and work well with roll-to roll manufacturing for mass production. OPV uses "only abundant elements coupled to an extremely low embodied energy through very low processing temperatures using only ambient processing conditions on simple printing equipment enabling energy pay-back times". Current efficiencies range 1–6.5%, however theoretical analyses show promise beyond 10% efficiency.

Many different configurations of OPV exist using different materials for each layer. OPV technology rivals existing PV technologies in terms of EPBT even if they currently present a shorter operational lifetime. A 2013 study analyzed 12 different configurations all with 2% efficiency, the EPBT ranged from 0.29 to 0.52 years for 1 m^{2} of PV. The average CO_{2}-eq/kWh for OPV is 54.922 grams.

=== Thermophotovoltaics ===
Thermophotovoltaic (TPV) energy conversion is a direct conversion process from heat to electricity via photons. A basic thermophotovoltaic system consists of a hot object emitting thermal radiation and a photovoltaic cell similar to a solar cell but tuned to the spectrum being emitted from the hot object.

As TPV systems generally work at lower temperatures than solar cells, their efficiencies tend to be low. Offsetting this through the use of multi-junction cells based on non-silicon materials is common, but generally very expensive. This currently limits TPV to niche roles like spacecraft power and waste heat collection from larger systems like steam turbines.

=== Photovoltaic-Thermoelectric Generator ===
Photovoltaic-Thermoelectric Generator (PV-TEG) hybrid system is a type of hybrid PV cell that pairs a photovoltaic (PV) cell with a thermoelectric generator (TEG). TEGs rely on the Seebeck effect, a phenomenon that occurs when a junction of two conducting materials experience a temperature difference thereby, inducing an electromotive force. The resulting voltage is directly proportional to the temperature difference.

During the process of converting light into electricity, heat dissipates, making PV cells less efficient at high temperatures and reducing their lifespan. By integrating a TEG into the system, heat is facilitated away from the PV cell and converts it into electricity, thereby improving its efficiency and longevity.

The thermoelectric figure of merit ZT, determines the efficiency of converting heat into electricity as well as the ability to cool. Optimizing parameters such as electrical conductivity (σ), Seebeck coefficient (S), thermal conductivity (κ) are of interest to maximize efficiencies.

$ZT = {\sigma S^2 T \over \kappa}$

Common thermoelectric materials typically have a ZT value of about 1, corresponding to an efficiency of approximately 10% or less. While typical TEGs have a low conversion efficiency, ongoing research in thermoelectric materials such as BiTe (ZT = 2.4), SnSe (ZT = 2.6), and half-Heusler compounds (ZT = 1.6) have led to improvement in efficiency over the years. Theoretical predictions indicate greater potential for optimization, with estimated values of 14 for BiTe, 2.6 for SnSe, and 2.2 for half-Heusler.

=== Solar module alignment ===
A number of solar modules may also be mounted vertically above each other in a tower, if the zenith distance of the Sun is greater than zero, and the tower can be turned horizontally as a whole and each module additionally around a horizontal axis. In such a tower the modules can follow the Sun exactly. Such a device may be described as a ladder mounted on a turnable disk. Each step of that ladder is the middle axis of a rectangular solar panel. In case the zenith distance of the Sun reaches zero, the "ladder" may be rotated to the north or the south to avoid a solar module producing a shadow on a lower one. Instead of an exactly vertical tower one can choose a tower with an axis directed to the polar star, meaning that it is parallel to the rotation axis of the Earth. In this case the angle between the axis and the Sun is always larger than 66 degrees. During a day it is only necessary to turn the panels around this axis to follow the Sun. Installations may be ground-mounted (and sometimes integrated with farming and grazing) or built into the roof or walls of a building (building-integrated photovoltaics).

Where land may be limited, PV can be deployed as floating solar. In 2008 the Far Niente Winery pioneered the world's first "floatovoltaic" system by installing 994 photovoltaic solar panels onto 130 pontoons and floating them on the winery's irrigation pond. A benefit of the set up is that the panels are kept at a lower temperature than they would be on land, leading to a higher efficiency of solar energy conversion. The floating panels also reduce the amount of water lost through evaporation and inhibit the growth of algae.

Concentrator photovoltaics is a technology that contrary to conventional flat-plate PV systems uses lenses and curved mirrors to focus sunlight onto small, but highly efficient, multi-junction solar cells. These systems sometimes use solar trackers and a cooling system to increase their efficiency.

=== Efficiency ===
Best research-cell efficiencies

In 2019, the world record for solar cell efficiency at 47.1% was achieved by using multi-junction concentrator solar cells, developed at National Renewable Energy Laboratory, Colorado, US. The highest efficiencies achieved without concentration include a material by Sharp Corporation at 35.8% using a proprietary triple-junction manufacturing technology in 2009, and Boeing Spectrolab (40.7% also using a triple-layer design).

There is an ongoing effort to increase the conversion efficiency of PV cells and modules, primarily for competitive advantage. In order to increase the efficiency of solar cells, it is important to choose a semiconductor material with an appropriate band gap that matches the solar spectrum. This will enhance the electrical and optical properties. Improving the method of charge collection is also useful for increasing the efficiency. There are several groups of materials that are being developed. Ultrahigh-efficiency devices (η>30%) are made by using GaAs and GaInP2 semiconductors with multijunction tandem cells. High-quality, single-crystal silicon materials are used to achieve high-efficiency, low cost cells (η>20%).

Recent developments in organic photovoltaic cells (OPVs) have made significant advancements in power conversion efficiency from 3% to over 15% since their introduction in the 1980s. To date, the highest reported power conversion efficiency ranges 6.7–8.94% for small molecule, 8.4–10.6% for polymer OPVs, and 7–21% for perovskite OPVs. OPVs are expected to play a major role in the PV market. Recent improvements have increased the efficiency and lowered cost, while remaining environmentally-benign and renewable.

Several companies have begun embedding power optimizers into PV modules called smart modules. These modules perform maximum power point tracking (MPPT) for each module individually, measure performance data for monitoring, and provide additional safety features. Such modules can also compensate for shading effects, wherein a shadow falling across a section of a module causes the electrical output of one or more strings of cells in the module to decrease.

One of the major causes for the decreased performance of cells is overheating. The efficiency of a solar cell declines by about 0.5% for every 1 degree Celsius increase in temperature. This means that a 100 degree increase in surface temperature could decrease the efficiency of a solar cell by about half. Self-cooling solar cells are one solution to this problem. Rather than using energy to cool the surface, pyramid and cone shapes can be formed from silica, and attached to the surface of a solar panel. Doing so allows visible light to reach the solar cells, but reflects infrared rays (which carry heat).

== Advantages ==
- Pollution and energy in production

The 122 PW of sunlight reaching the Earth's surface is plentiful—almost 10,000 times more than the 13 TW equivalent of average power consumed in 2005 by humans. This abundance leads to the suggestion that it will not be long before solar energy will become the world's primary energy source. Additionally, solar radiation has the highest power density (global mean of 170 W/m^{2}) among renewable energies.

Solar power is pollution-free during use, which enables it to cut down on pollution when it is substituted for other energy sources. For example, MIT estimated that 52,000 people per year die prematurely in the U.S. from coal-fired power plant pollution and all but one of these deaths could be prevented from using PV to replace coal. Production end-wastes and emissions are manageable using existing pollution controls. End-of-use recycling technologies are under development and policies are being produced that encourage recycling from producers.

Solar panels are usually guaranteed for 25 years (but inverters tend to fail sooner), with little maintenance or intervention after their initial set-up, so after the initial capital cost of building any solar power plant, operating costs are extremely low compared to existing power technologies. One approach to improving PV environmental performance is with circular PV modules that are designed to be easily disassembled.

Rooftop solar can be used locally, thus reducing transmission/distribution losses.

- Solar cell research investment

Compared to fossil and nuclear energy sources, very little research money has been invested in the development of solar cells, so there is considerable room for improvement. Nevertheless, experimental high efficiency solar cells already have efficiencies of over 40% in case of concentrating photovoltaic cells and efficiencies are rapidly rising while mass-production costs are rapidly falling.

- Housing subsidies

In some states of the United States, much of the investment in a home-mounted system may be lost if the homeowner moves and the buyer puts less value on the system than the seller. The city of Berkeley developed an innovative financing method to remove this limitation, by adding a tax assessment that is transferred with the home to pay for the solar panels. Now known as PACE, Property Assessed Clean Energy, 30 U.S. states have duplicated this solution.

== Disadvantages ==
- Impact on electricity network

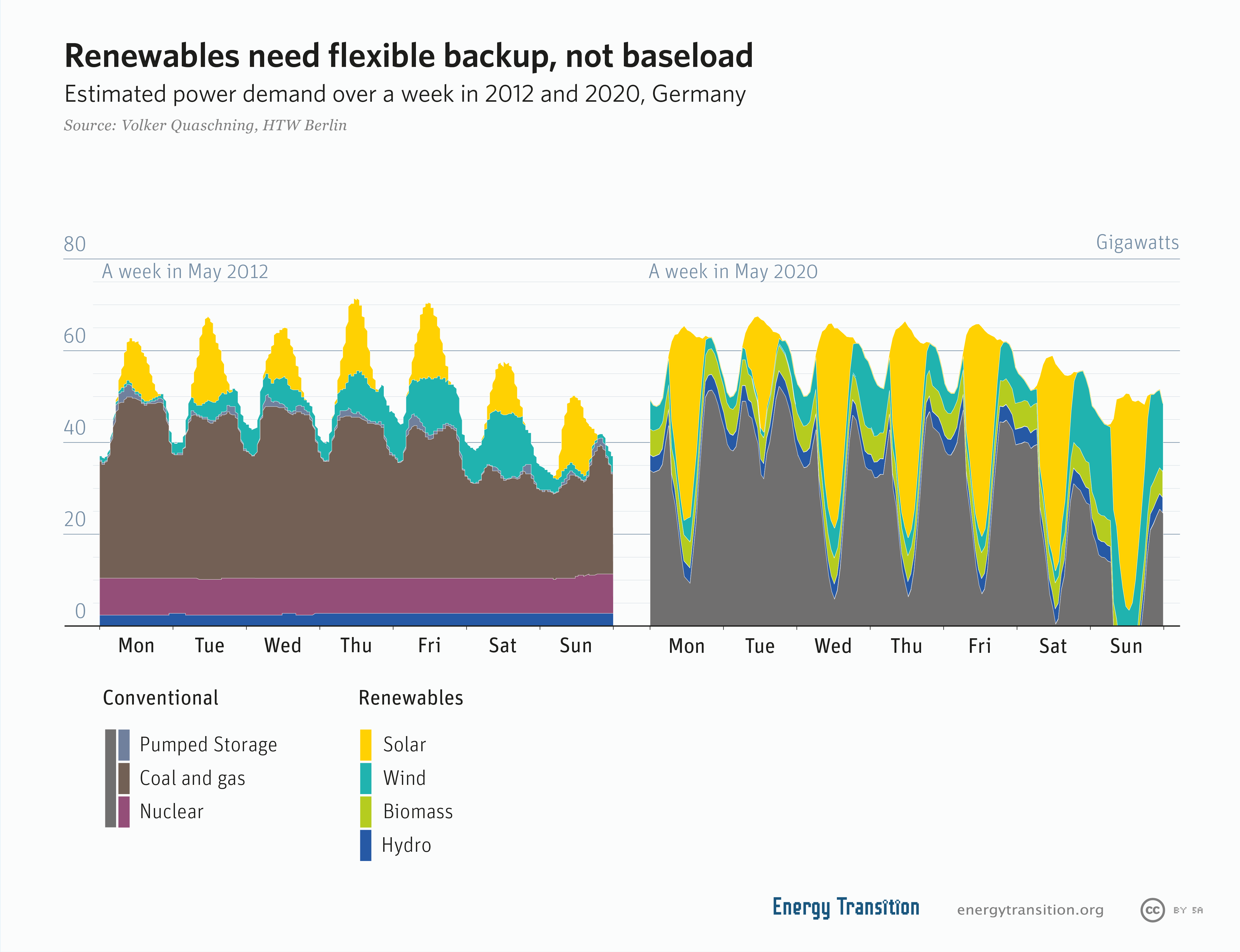
Grids with high penetration of renewable energy sources generally need more flexible generation rather than baseload generation.

For behind-the-meter rooftop photovoltaic systems, the energy flow becomes two-way. When there is more local generation than consumption, electricity is exported to the grid, allowing for net metering. However, electricity networks traditionally are not designed to deal with two-way energy transfer, which may introduce technical issues. An over-voltage issue may come out as the electricity flows from these PV households back to the network. There are solutions to manage the over-voltage issue, such as regulating PV inverter power factor, new voltage and energy control equipment at electricity distributor level, re-conductor the electricity wires, demand side management, etc. There are often limitations and costs related to these solutions.

High generation during the middle of the day reduces the net generation demand, but higher peak net demand as the sun goes down can require rapid ramping of utility generating stations, producing a load profile called the duck curve.

== See also ==
- Agrivoltaic
- American Solar Energy Society
- Anomalous photovoltaic effect
- Copper in renewable energy § Solar photovoltaic power generation
- Cost of electricity by source
- Energy demand management
- Electromotive force § Solar cell
- List of photovoltaics companies
- Photoelectrochemical cell
- Quantum efficiency § Quantum efficiency of solar cells
- Renewable energy commercialization
- Solar cell fabric
- Solar module quality assurance
- Solar photovoltaic monitoring
- Solar power by country
- Solar thermal energy
- Theory of solar cell
