= Asset-backed security =

Security with value derived from a commodity or asset

An asset-backed security (ABS) is a security whose income payments, and hence value, are derived from and collateralized (or "backed") by a specified pool of underlying assets.

The pool of assets is typically a group of small and illiquid assets which are unable to be sold individually. Pooling the assets into financial instruments allows them to be sold to general investors, a process called securitization, and allows the risk of investing in the underlying assets to be diversified because each security will represent a fraction of the total value of the diverse pool of underlying assets. The pools of underlying assets can vary from common payments on credit cards, auto loans, and mortgage loans, to esoteric cash flows from aircraft leases, royalty payments, or movie revenues.

Often a separate institution, called a special-purpose vehicle, is created to handle the securitization of asset-backed securities. The special-purpose vehicle, which creates and sells the securities, uses the proceeds of the sale to pay back the bank that created, or originated, the underlying assets.

The special-purpose vehicle is responsible for "bundling" the underlying assets into a specified pool that will fit the risk preferences and other needs of investors who might want to buy the securities, for managing credit risk – often by transferring it to an insurance company after paying a premium – and for distributing payments from the securities. As long as the credit risk of the underlying assets is transferred to another institution, the originating bank removes the value of the underlying assets from its balance sheet and receives cash in return as the asset-backed securities are sold, a transaction which can improve its credit rating and reduce the amount of capital that it needs. In this case, a credit rating of the asset-backed securities would be based only on the assets and liabilities of the special-purpose vehicle, and this rating could be higher than if the originating bank issued the securities because the risk of the asset-backed securities would no longer be associated with other risks that the originating bank might bear. A higher credit rating could allow the special-purpose vehicle and, by extension, the originating institution to pay a lower interest rate (and hence, charge a higher price) on the asset-backed securities than if the originating institution borrowed funds or issued bonds.

Thus, one incentive for banks to create securitized assets is to remove risky assets from their balance sheet by having another institution assume the credit risk, so that they (the banks) receive cash in return. This allows banks to invest more of their capital in new loans or other assets and possibly have a lower capital requirement.

== Definition ==
An "asset-backed security" is sometimes used as an umbrella term for a type of security backed by a pool of assets, and sometimes for a particular type of that security – one backed by consumer loans or loans, leases or receivables other than real estate. In the first case, collateralized debt obligations (CDO, securities backed by debt obligations – often other asset-backed securities) and mortgage-backed securities (MBS, where the assets are mortgages), are subsets, different kinds of asset-backed securities. (Example: "The capital market in which asset-backed securities are issued and traded is composed of three main categories: ABS, MBS and CDOs". (italics added)). In the second case, an "asset-backed security" – or at least the abbreviation "ABS" – refers to just one of the subsets, one backed by consumer-backed products, and is distinct from a MBS or CDO, (example: "As a rule of thumb, securitization issues backed by mortgages are called MBS, and securitization issues backed by debt obligations are called CDO .... Securitization issues backed by consumer-backed products – car loans, consumer loans and credit cards, among others – are called ABS

== Structure ==
=== United States ===
On January 18, 2005, the United States Securities and Exchange Commission (SEC) promulgated Regulation AB which included a final definition of Asset-Backed Securities.

"Definition of ABS. The term "asset-backed security" is currently defined in Form S-3 to mean a security that is primarily serviced by the cash flows of a discrete pool of receivables or other financial assets, either fixed or revolving, that by their terms convert into cash within a finite time period plus any rights or other assets designed to assure the servicing or timely distribution of proceeds to the security holders. The SEC has interpreted the phrase "convert into cash by their terms" to exclude most assets that require active behavior to acquire cash – such as the selling of non-performing assets and physical property. It has also interpreted the phrase "discrete pool" to exclude those that can change in composition over time.

- Lease-Backed Securities. The new rule expands the definition of "asset-backed security" to include lease-backed securities as long as the residual value of the leased property is less than 50% of the original securitized pool balance (or less than 65% in the case of motor vehicle leases). However, such securities may be shelf-registered on Form S-3 only if the residual value of the leased property represents less than 20% of the original securitized pool balance (or less than 65% in the case of motor vehicle leases).

- Delinquent and Non-performing Assets. The new rules provide that a security may be considered to be an "asset-backed security" even if the underlying asset pool has total delinquencies of up to 50% at the time of the proposed offering as long as the original asset pool does not include any "non-performing" assets. However, consistent with current practice, shelf registration on Form S-3 will be available only if delinquent assets constitute 20% or less of the original asset pool. An asset is considered to be non-performing if it satisfies the charge-off policies of the sponsor (or applicable bank regulatory agencies) or if it would be considered a charged-off asset under the terms of the applicable transaction documents.

- Exceptions to the "Discrete Pool" Requirement. The new rules generally codify the SEC staff’s position that a security must be backed by a discrete pool of assets in order to be considered an ABS. However, the new rules establish the following exceptions to address market practices.

(1) Any security issued in a master trust structure would meet the definition of "asset-backed security" without limitation.

(2) "asset-backed securities" will also include securities with a prefunding period of up to one year during which up to 50% of the offering proceeds (or, in the case of master trusts, up to 50% of the aggregate principal balance of the total asset pool whose cash flows support the ABS) may be used for subsequent purchases of pool assets.

(3) The new rules also include within the definition of "asset-backed security" securities with revolving periods during which new financial assets may be acquired. In the case of revolving assets such as credit cards, dealer floorplan and home equity lines of credit, there is no limit to the length of the revolving period or the amount of new assets that can be purchased during that time. For securities backed by receivables or other financial assets that do not arise under revolving accounts, such as automobile loans and mortgage loans, an unlimited revolving period will be permitted for up to three years. However, the new assets added to the pool during the revolving period must be of the same general character as the original pool assets.

According to Thomson Financial League Tables, US issuance (excluding mortgage-backed securities) was:

- 2004: USD 857 billion (1,595 issues)
- 2003: USD 581 billion (1,175 issues)

== Types ==
=== Home equity loans ===
Securities collateralized by home equity loans (HELs) are currently the largest asset class within the ABS market. Investors typically refer to HELs as any nonagency loans that do not fit into either the jumbo or alt-A loan categories. While early HELs were mostly second-lien subprime mortgages, first-lien loans now make up the majority of issuance. Subprime mortgage borrowers have a less-than-perfect credit history and are required to pay interest rates higher than what would be available to a typical agency borrower. In addition to first- and second-lien loans, other HE loans can consist of high loan to value (LTV) loans, re-performing loans, scratch and dent loans, or open-ended home equity lines of credit (HELOC), which homeowners use as a method to consolidate debt.

=== Auto loans ===
The second-largest subsector in the ABS market is auto loans. Auto finance companies issue securities backed by underlying pools of auto-related loans. Auto ABS are classified into three categories: prime, nonprime, and subprime:

- Prime auto ABS are collaterized by loans made to borrowers with strong credit histories.
- Nonprime auto ABS consist of loans made to lesser credit quality consumers, which may have higher cumulative losses.
- Subprime borrowers will typically have lower incomes, tainted credited histories, or both.

Owner trusts are the most common structure used when issuing auto loans and allow investors to receive interest and principal on sequential basis. Deals can also be structured to pay on a pro-rata or combination of the two.

=== Credit card receivables ===
Securities backed by credit card receivables have been benchmark for the ABS market since they were first introduced in 1987. A credit card holder may borrow funds on a revolving basis up to an assigned credit limit. The borrower then pays principal and interest as desired, along with the required minimum monthly payments. Because principal repayment is not scheduled, credit card debt does not have an actual maturity date and is considered a nonamortizing loan.

ABS backed by credit card receivables are issued out of trusts that have evolved over time from discrete trusts to various types of master trusts of which the most common is the de-linked master trust. Discrete trusts consist of a fixed or static pool of receivables that are tranched into senior/subordinated bonds. A master trust has the advantage of offering multiple deals out of the same trust as the number of receivables grows, each of which is entitled to a pro-rata share of all of the receivables. The delinked structures allow the issuer to separate the senior and subordinate series within a trust and issue them at different points in time. The latter two structures allow investors to benefit from a larger pool of loans made over time rather than one static pool.

=== Student loans ===
ABS collateralized by student loans (“SLABS”) comprise one of the four (along with home equity loans, auto loans, and credit card receivables) core asset classes financed through asset-backed securitizations and are a benchmark subsector for most floating rate indices . Federal Family Education Loan Program (FFELP) loans are the most common form of student loans and are guaranteed by the U.S. Department of Education ("USDE") at rates ranging from 95%–98% (if the student loan is serviced by a servicer designated as an "exceptional performer" by the USDE the reimbursement rate was up to 100%). As a result, performance (other than high cohort default rates in the late 1980s) has historically been very good, and investors' rate of return has been excellent. The College Cost Reduction and Access Act became effective on October 1, 2007, and significantly changed the economics for FFELP loans; lender special allowance payments were reduced, the exceptional performer designation was revoked, lender insurance rates were reduced, and the lender paid origination fees were doubled. The FFELP loan program ended in 2010, but as of 2020 there was about $245 billion in outstanding debt from 11 million debtors.

A second, and faster-growing, portion of the student loan market consists of non-FFELP or private student loans. Though borrowing limits on certain types of FFELP loans were slightly increased by the student loan bill referenced above, essentially static borrowing limits for FFELP loans and increasing tuition are driving students to search for alternative lenders. Students utilize private loans to bridge the gap between amounts that can be borrowed through federal programs and the remaining costs of education.

The United States Congress created the Student Loan Marketing Association (Sallie Mae) as a government-sponsored enterprise to purchase student loans in the secondary market and to securitize pools of student loans. Since its first issuance in 1995, Sallie Mae is now the major issuer of SLABS and its issues are viewed as the benchmark issues.

=== Stranded cost utilities ===
Rate reduction bonds (RRBs) came about as the result of the Energy Policy Act of 1992, which was designed to increase competition in the US electricity market. To avoid any disruptions while moving from a non-competitive to a competitive market, regulators have allowed utilities to recover certain "transition costs" over a period of time. These costs are considered non-bypassable and are added to all customer bills. Since consumers usually pay utility bills before any other, chargeoffs have historically been low. RRBs offerings are typically large enough to create reasonable liquidity in the aftermarket, and average life extension is limited by a "true up" mechanism.

=== Others ===
There are many other cash-flow-producing assets, including manufactured housing loans, equipment leases and loans, aircraft leases, trade receivables, dealer floor plan loans, securities portfolios, and royalties. Intangibles are another emerging asset class.

== Trading asset-backed securities ==
"In the United States, the process for issuing asset-backed securities in the primary market is similar to that of issuing other securities, such as corporate bonds, and is governed by the Securities Act of 1933, and the Securities Exchange Act of 1934, as amended. Publicly issued asset-backed securities have to satisfy standard SEC registration and disclosure requirements, and have to file periodic financial statements."

"The Process of trading asset-backed securities in the secondary market is similar to that of trading corporate bonds, and also to some extent, mortgage-backed securities. Most of the trading is done in over-the-counter markets, with telephone quotes on a security basis. There appear to be no publicly available measures of trading volume, or of number of dealers trading in these securities."

"A survey by the Bond Market Association shows that at the end of 2004, in the United States and Europe there were 74 electronic trading platforms for trading fixed-income securities and derivatives, with 5 platforms for asset-backed securities in the United States, and 8 in Europe."

"Discussions with market participants show that compared to Treasury securities and mortgage-backed securities, many asset-backed securities are not liquid, and their prices are not transparent. This is partly because asset-backed securities are not as standardized as Treasury securities, or even mortgage-backed securities, and investors have to evaluate the different structures, maturity profiles, credit enhancements, and other features of an asset-backed security before trading it."

The "price" of an asset-backed security is usually quoted as a spread to a corresponding swap rate. For example, the price of a credit card-backed, AAA rated security with a two-year maturity by a benchmark issuer might be quoted at 5 basis points (or less) to the two-year swap rate."

"Indeed, market participants sometimes view the highest-rated credit card and automobile securities as having default risk close to that of the highest-rated mortgage-backed securities, which are reportedly viewed as substitute for the default risk-free Treasury securities."

== Securitization ==
Securitization is the process of creating asset-backed securities by transferring assets from the issuing company to a bankruptcy remote entity. Credit enhancement is an integral component of this process as it creates a security that has a higher rating than the issuing company, which allows the issuing company to monetize its assets while paying a lower rate of interest than would be possible via a secured bank loan or debt issuance by the issuing company.

== ABS indices ==
On January 17, 2006, CDS Indexco and Markit launched ABX.HE, a synthetic asset-backed credit derivative index, with plans to extend the index to other underlying asset types other than home equity loans. ABS indices allow investors to gain broad exposure to the subprime market without holding the actual asset-backed securities.

== Advantages and disadvantages ==
A significant advantage of asset-backed securities for loan originators (with associated disadvantages for investors) is that they bring together a pool of financial assets that otherwise could not easily be traded in their existing form. By pooling together a large portfolio of these illiquid assets they can be converted into instruments that may be offered and sold freely in the capital markets. The tranching of these securities into instruments with theoretically different risk/return profiles facilitates marketing of the bonds to investors with different risk appetites and investing time horizons.

Asset-backed securities provide originators with the following advantages, each of which directly adds to investor risk:

- Selling these financial assets to the pools reduces their risk-weighted assets and thereby frees up their capital, enabling them to originate still more loans.
- Asset-backed securities lower their risk. In a worst-case scenario where the pool of assets performs very badly, "the owner of ABS (which is either the issuer, or the guarantor, or the re-modeler, or the guarantor of the last resort) might pay the price of bankruptcy rather than the originator." In case the originator or the issuer is made to pay the price of the same, it amounts to re-inventing of the lending practices, restructuring from other profitable avenues of the functioning of the originator as well as the norms of the issuance of the same and consolidation in the form of either merger or benchmarking (internal same sector, external different sector).

This risk is measured and contained by the lender of last resort from time to time auctions and other Instruments that are used to re-inject the same bad loans held over a longer time duration to the appropriate buyers over a period of time based on the instruments available for the bank to carry out its business as per the business charter or the licensings granted to the specific banks. The risk can also be diversified by using the alternate geographies, or alternate vehicles of investments and alternate division of the bank, depending on the type and magnitude of the risk.

The exposure of these refinanced loans to "bad credit" (Type II) decisions (particularly in the banking sector, unscrupulous lending or the adverse selection of credits) is hedged against by the sellers of the same, or the re-structurers of the same. Thinking of securitization (insurance) as a panacea for all the ills of bad credit decisions might lead to the hedging of the risk by the transfer of the "hot potato" from one issuer to another without the actual asset against which the loan is backed reaching an upswing in value, either by the demand-supply mismatch being addressed or by one of the following factors:

- The economic productivity of the business cycle being reversed from downturn to upturn (monetary and fiscal measures)
- More buyers than sellers in the market
- A breakthrough innovation.

On a day-to-day basis the transferring of the loans from the

- Sub-ordinate debt (freshly made and highly collateralized debt) to the
- Sub-ordinate realizable
- Sub-ordinate non-realizable

Senior as well as bad (securitized) debt might be a better way to distinguish between the assets that might require or be found eligible for re-insurance or write – off or impaired against the assets of the collaterals or is realized as a trade-off of the loan granted against or the addition of goods or services.
This is totally built up in any bank based on the terms of these deposits, and dynamic updation of the same as regards to the extent of the exposure or bad credit to be faced, as guided by the accounting standards, and adjudged by the financial and non-market (diversifiable) risks, with a contingency for the market (non-diversifiable) risks, for the specified types of the accounting headers as found in the balance sheets or the reporting or recognition (company based declaration of the standards) of the same as short term, long term as well as medium term debt and depreciation standards.

The issuance of the accounting practices and standards as regards to the different holding patterns, adds to the accountability that is sought, in case the problem increases in magnitude.

- The originators earn fees from originating the loans, as well as from servicing the assets throughout their life.

The ability to earn substantial fees from originating and securitizing loans, coupled with the absence of any residual liability, skews the incentives of originators in favor of loan volume rather than loan quality. This is an intrinsic structural flaw in the loan-securitization market that was directly responsible for both the credit bubble of the mid-2000s (decade) as well as the credit crisis, as well as the 2008 financial crisis.

"The financial institutions that originate the loans sell a pool of cashflow-producing assets to a specially created "third party that is called a special-purpose vehicle (SPV)". The SPV (securitization, credit derivatives, commodity derivative, commercial paper based temporary capital and funding sought for the running, merger activities of the company, external funding in the form of venture capitalists, angel investors etc. being a few of them) is "designed to insulate investors from the credit risk (availability as well as issuance of credit in terms of assessment of bad loans or hedging of the already available good loans as part of the practice) of the originating financial institution".

The SPV then sells the pooled loans to a trust, which issues interest bearing securities that can achieve a credit rating separate from the financial institution that originates the loan. The typically higher credit rating is given because the securities that are used to fund the securitization rely solely on the cash flow created by the assets, not on the payment promise of the issuer.

The monthly payments from the underlying assets – loans or receivables – typically consist of principal and interest, with principal being scheduled or unscheduled. The cash flows produced by the underlying assets can be allocated to investors in different ways. Cash flows can be directly passed through to investors after administrative fees are subtracted, thus creating a pass-through security (also known as a "pay-through security"). Alternatively, cash flows can be carved up according to specified rules and market demand, thus creating "structured" securities."

This is an organized way of functioning of the credit markets at least in the Developed Primary non-tradable in the open market, company to company, bank to bank dealings to keep the markets running, afloat as well as operational and provision of the liquidity by the liquidity providers in the market, which is very well scrutinized for any "aberration, excessive instrument based hedging and market manipulation" or "outlier, volumes" based trades or any such "anomalies, block trades 'company treasury' based decision without proper and posterior/prior intimation", by the respective regulators as directed by the law and as spotted in the regular hours of trading in the pre-market/after-hours trading or in the event based specific stocks and corrected and scrutinized for insider trading in the form of cancellation of the trades, re-issuance of the amount of the cancelled trades or freezing of the markets (specific securities being taken off the trading list for the duration of time) in event of a pre-set, defined by the maximum and minimum fluctuation in the trading in the secondary market that is the over the counter markets.

Generally the Primary markets are more scrutinized by the same commission but this market comes under the category of institutional and company related trades and underwritings, as well as guarantees and hence is governed by the broader set of rules as directed in the corporate and business law and reporting standards governing the business in the specific geography.

== Government bailouts ==
The US government has provided relief to the ABS industry through Term Asset-Backed Securities Loan Facility (TALF) during the Great Recession of 2008 and the COVID-19 pandemic.

== See also ==
- Asset-backed commercial paper
- A notes
- Asset-based lending
- Asset-based loan
- Collateralized debt obligation
- Credit enhancement
- Mortgage-backed security
- Pooled investment
- Privatization
- Real-World Assets
- Securitization transaction
- Structured finance
- Term Asset-Backed Securities Loan Facility
- Tranche
- Thomson Financial League Tables
