= Credit enhancement =

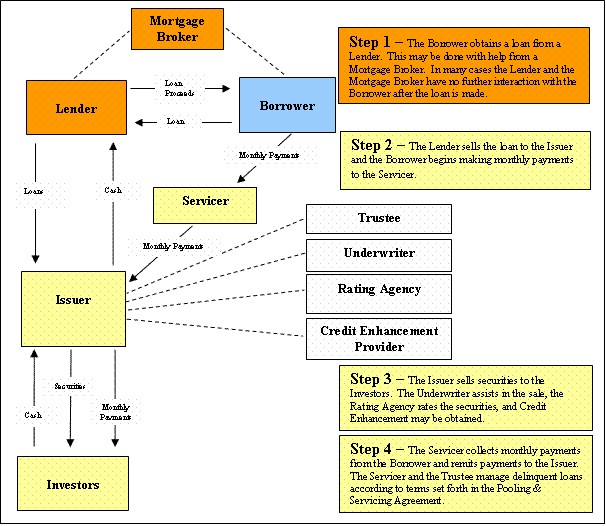
Borrowing under a securitization structure

Credit enhancement is the improvement of the credit profile of a structured financial transaction or the methods used to improve the credit profiles of such products or transactions. It is a key part of the securitization transaction in structured finance, and is important for credit rating agencies when rating a securitization.

== Types ==
There are two primary types of credit enhancement: internal and external.

== Internal credit enhancement ==
=== Subordination or credit tranching ===
Establishing a senior/subordinated structure is one of the most popular techniques to create internal credit enhancement. Cash flows generated by assets are allocated with different priorities to classes of varying seniorities. The senior/subordinated structure thus consists of several tranches, from the most senior to the most subordinated (or junior). The subordinated tranches function as protective layers of the more senior tranches. The tranche with the highest seniority has the first right on cash flow.

Such protection comes under a waterfall structure. Priority for cash flow comes from the top, while distribution of losses rises from the bottom. If an asset in the pool defaults, the losses thus incurred are allocated from the bottom up (from the most junior to the most senior tranche). The senior tranche (often rated AAA) is unaffected, unless the amount of the losses exceeds the amount in the subordinated tranches.

=== Excess spread ===
The excess spread is the difference between the interest rate received on the underlying collateral and the coupon on the issued security. It is typically one of the first defenses against loss. Even if some of the underlying loan payments are late or default, the coupon payment can still be made. In the process of "turboing", excess spread is applied to outstanding classes as principal.

=== Overcollateralization ===
Overcollateralization (OC) is a commonly used form of credit enhancement. With this support structure, the face value of the underlying loan portfolio is larger than the security it backs, thus the issued security is overcollateralized. In this manner, even if some of the payments from the underlying loans are late or default, principal and interest payments on the ABS (asset-backed security) can still be made.

=== Reserve account ===
A reserve account is created to reimburse the issuing trust for losses up to the amount allocated for the reserve. To increase credit support, the reserve account will often be non-declining throughout the life of the security, meaning that the account will increase proportionally up to some specified level as the outstanding debt is paid off.

== External credit enhancement ==
=== Surety bonds ===
Surety bonds are insurance policies that reimburse the ABS for any losses. They are external forms of credit enhancement. ABS paired with surety bonds have ratings that are the same as that of the surety bond’s issuer. By law, surety companies cannot provide a bond as a form of a credit enhancement guarantee.

=== Wrapped securities ===
A wrapped security is insured or guaranteed by a third party. A third party or, in some cases, the parent company of the ABS issuer may provide a promise to reimburse the trust for losses up to a specified amount. Deals can also include agreements to advance principal and interest or to buy back any defaulted loans. The third-party guarantees are typically provided by AAA-rated financial guarantors or monoline insurance companies.

=== Letter of credit ===
With a letter of credit (LOC), a financial institution — usually a bank — is paid a fee to provide a specified cash amount to reimburse the ABS-issuing trust for any cash shortfalls from the collateral, up to the required credit support amount. Letters of credit are becoming less common forms of credit enhancement, as much of their appeal was lost when the rating agencies downgraded the long-term debt of several LOC-provider banks in the early 1990s. Because securities enhanced with LOCs from these lenders faced possible downgrades as well, issuers began to utilize cash collateral accounts instead of LOCs in cases where external credit support was needed.

=== Cash collateral account ===
With a cash collateral account (CCA), credit enhancement is achieved when the issuer borrows the required credit support amount from a commercial bank and then deposits this cash in short-term commercial paper that has the highest available credit quality. Because a CCA is an actual deposit of cash, a downgrade of the CCA provider would not result in a similar downgrade of the security.

== See also ==
- Pooled investment
- Senior stretch loan
