= ALAFCO =

Aircraft-leasing company

ALAFCO - Aviation Lease and Finance Company
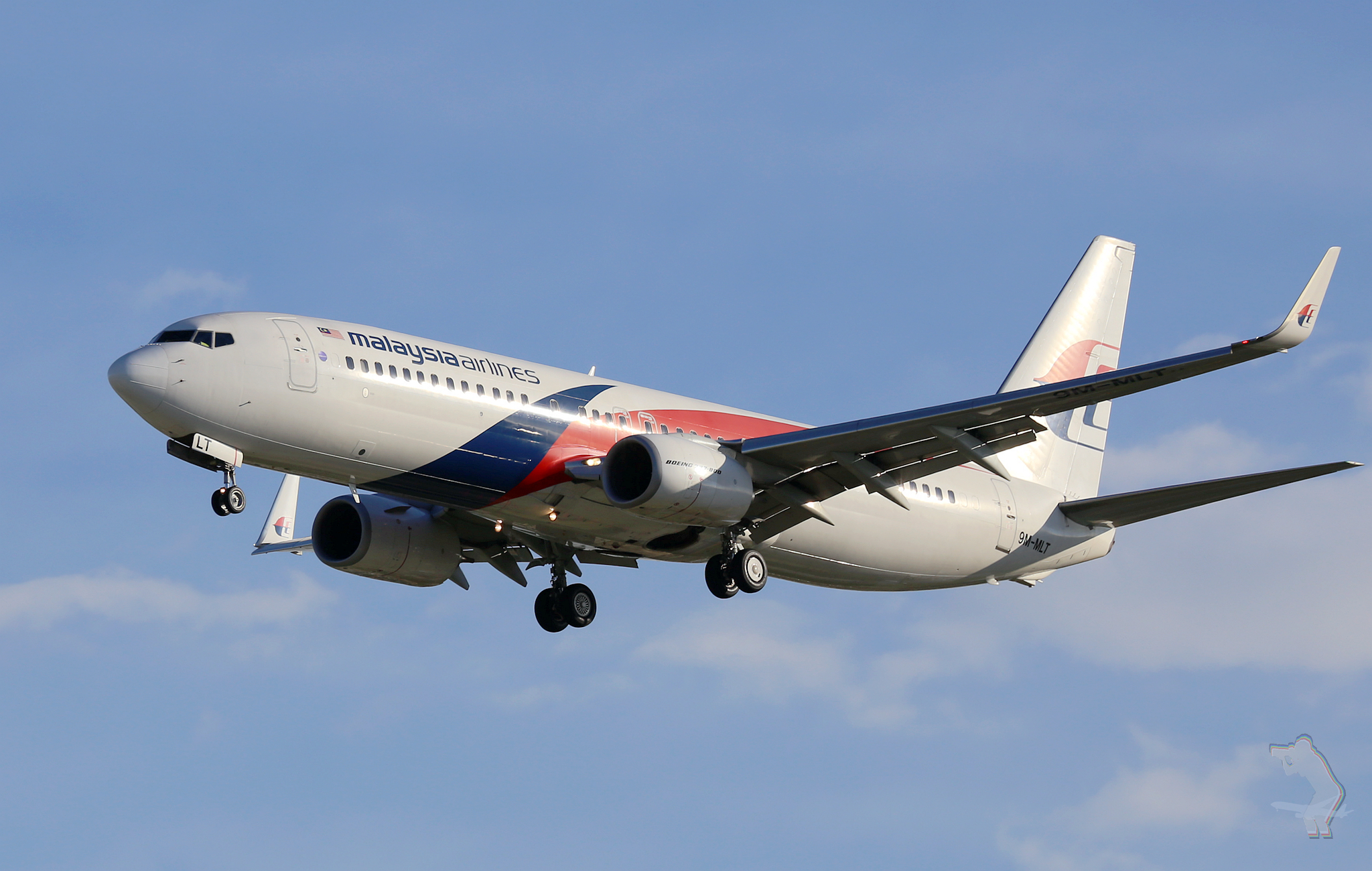
- An Boeing 737-800 under lease from ALAFCO to Malaysia Airlines
- Trade name: KSE: ALAFCO
- ISIN: KW0EQ0602221
- Industry: Aircraft finance
- Founded: 1992
- Headquarters: Kuwait City, Kuwait
- Area served: Worldwide
- Key people: Adel Ahmad Albanwan (CEO)
- Operating income: KD97 million
- Total assets: KD1.2 billion (2022)
- Total equity: KD224 million (2022)
- Owners: Kuwait Finance House; Gulf Investment Corporation; Kuwait Airways
- Website: www.alafco.com

ALAFCO (Aviation Lease and Finance Company) is a Kuwaiti aircraft-leasing company founded in Kuwait City in 1992. It is jointly owned by the Kuwait Finance House, Gulf Investment Corporation and Kuwait Airways. Its lease terms are Islamic economical jurisprudence-compliant.

== Customers ==
ALAFCO's customers include Thai Airways, Royal Jordanian, Malaysia Airlines, Garuda Indonesia, Air Europa, Turkish Airlines, China Eastern Airlines, Pakistan International Airlines, Yemenia, Air India, China Southern Airlines, Sky Airlines, Saudi Arabian Airlines, Sun Country Airlines, VietJet Air, Jet2.com, and GoAir.

Future planned leases include six 787s for Oman Air.

== Fleet ==
In October 2006, ALAFCO was planning to increase its fleet to 80 aircraft by 2015, up from the current 18. After growing from 26 to 40 in 2010, Its fleet was reported as 70 aircraft in January 2020.

In April 2020, ALAFCO sued Boeing for $336 million in Chicago federal court, accusing it of refusing to return advance payments on an order of 737 MAX planes (which were grounded worldwide) which it had cancelled the previous month. It later withdrew the suit, agreeing to order 20 instead of the planned 40.

=== Announced fleet expansions ===
Date	Aircraft	Delivery date	Reference
12 March 2007	12 Boeing 787-8, 6 Boeing 737-800	n/a	
18 June 2007	7 Airbus A320	2015	
8 July 2007	10 Boeing 787	2015	
26 June 2011	12 Airbus A350-900 XWB	2017	
4 Nov 2012	20 Boeing 737 MAX 8		
13 November 2017	40 (later reduced to 20) Boeing 737 MAX	TBA	
Unknown	43 Airbus A320neo, 10 A321neo	2024 onwards	

== See also ==
- Commercial Aircraft Sales and Leasing
- Option (aircraft purchasing)
