= Equipment trust certificate =

An equipment trust certificate (ETC) is a financial security used in aircraft finance, most commonly to take advantage of tax benefits in North America.

== Details ==
In a typical ETC transaction, a "trust certificate" is sold to investors in order to finance the purchase of an aircraft by a trust managed on the investors' behalf. The trust then leases the aircraft to an airline, and the trustee routes payments through the trust to the investors. Upon maturity of the note, the airline receives title to the aircraft. See Pass-through certificate.

The lease is not a "true" lease because the airline receives title at the end. Therefore, ETCs are a form of secured debt financing similar to a mortgage. Because the aircraft is not owned by the airline until maturity, the aircraft is not considered airline property for the purposes of bankruptcy; however, alternative forms of financing such as mortgage and securitization lead to the same result, making this a relatively minor advantage in comparison to the tax benefits.

An Enhanced ETC (EETC), also known as a Double-E TC, is similar to a conventional ETC except that the security has been divided into two or more classes of securities, each with different payment priorities and asset claims. The more senior certificates (those with highest priority) have a higher credit rating and may obtain an investment grade rating for the particular issue. EETCs issues are similar to securitization transactions in that ownership remains with a separate trust rather than the operator, which has different tax implications.

== See also ==
- Sale and leaseback
