= Pass-through certificate =

A pass-through certificate is an instrument that evidences ownership in an underlying pool of assets, serving to signify the transfer of interest in favor of the holder. An equipment trust certificate is a specific case. In creating such a pass-through structure, the underlying assets are "bundled" into a pass-through security (also known as a "pay-through security"), where the principal and interest payments are "passed through" to certificate holders. Here, a servicing intermediary collects the monthly payments from issuers and passes them through to the security holders for a fee.

Pass-throughs are the basic structure on which securitizations are built; see mortgage-backed security, asset-backed security and collateralized debt obligation. The advantage of these structures is that they serve as a means of diversifying the asset pool and increasing the demand for and size of the offering. At the same time, the investor in a pass-through transaction acquires these rights subject to all their material risks, including prepayments, fluctuations in the asset portfolio, and the risk of interest rate variations.
