= Aircraft finance =

Financing for aircraft

Aircraft finance refers to financing for the purchase and operation of aircraft. Complex aircraft finance (such as those schemes employed by airlines) shares many characteristics with maritime finance, and to a lesser extent with project finance.

== Private aircraft ==
Financing for the purchase of private aircraft is similar to a mortgage or automobile loan. A basic transaction for a small personal or corporate aircraft may proceed as follows:

1. The borrower provides basic information about themselves and their prospective aircraft to the lender.
2. The lender performs an appraisal of the aircraft's value.
3. The lender performs a title search based on the aircraft's registration number, in order to confirm that no liens or title defects are present. In many cases, a title insurance policy is procured to protect against any undetected defects in title.
4. The lender then prepares documentation for the transaction:
  - A security agreement, which establishes a security interest in the aircraft, so that the lender may repossess it in the event of default on the loan
  - A promissory note, which makes the borrower responsible for any outstanding loan balance not covered by repossession of the aircraft
  - If the borrower is deemed less credit-worthy, a surety from a third party (or from multiple third parties)
5. At closing, the loan documentation is executed and then funds and title are transferred.

== Commercial aircraft ==
Aircraft are expensive and owning one requires hefty Capital Expenditure. A Boeing 737-700, the type Southwest uses, is priced in the range of $58.5–69.5 million. Airlines also typically have low margins so very few airlines can afford to pay cash for all their fleet.

Commercial aircraft, such as those operated by airlines, use more sophisticated leases and debt financing schemes. The three most common schemes for financing commercial aircraft are

1. Secured lending
2. Operating leasing
3. Finance leasing.

However, other ways to pay for the aircraft & flying equipment are:

1. Cash
2. Operating leasing and sale/leasebacks
3. Bank loans/finance leases
4. Export credit guaranteed loans
5. Tax leases
6. Manufacturer support
7. EETCs

These schemes are primarily distinguished by tax and accounting considerations, particularly tax-deductible depreciation, interest, operating costs which can reduce tax liability for the operator, lessor and financier.

In May 2016, lessors had a 42% share of the market. It was increasing until 2008 but has since stagnated, and should continue so if not for a rise an interest rates, a slowing of airlines' profits, an increase in lessors' share of new airliner deliveries, and market liberalization. Lessors could also increase their market share by including more start-up airlines, more older aircraft recycling, a change in views on residual values, and lower returns acceptance.

=== Direct lending ===
As described above for private aircraft, an airline may simply take out a secured or unsecured loan to buy a commercial aircraft. In such large transactions, a syndicate of banks may collectively provide a loan to the borrower.

Because the cost of a commercial aircraft may be hundreds of millions of dollars, most direct lending for aircraft purchases is accompanied by a security interest in the aircraft, so that the aircraft may be repossessed in event of non-payment. It is generally very difficult for borrowers to obtain affordable private unsecured financing of an aircraft purchase, unless the borrower is deemed particularly creditworthy (e.g. an established carrier with high equity and a steady cash flow). However, certain governments finance the export of domestically produced aircraft through the Large Aircraft Sector Understanding (LASU). This interstate agreement provides for financing of aircraft purchases at 120 to 175 points over prime rate for terms of 10 to 12 years, and the option to "lock in" an interest rate up to three months prior to taking out the loan. These terms are often less attractive for larger operators, which can obtain aircraft less expensively through other financing methods.

By directly owning their aircraft, airlines may deduct depreciation costs for tax purposes, or spread out depreciation costs to improve their bottom line. For instance, in 1992, Lufthansa adjusted its accounting to depreciate aircraft over 12 years instead of 10 years; the resulting drop in depreciation "expenses" caused the company's reported profits to rise by DM392 million. JAL made a similar adjustment in 1993, causing the company's profits to rise by ¥29.6 million.

On the other hand, prior to the advent of commercial aircraft leasing in the 1980s, privately owned airlines were highly vulnerable to market fluctuations due to their need to assume high levels of debt in order to purchase new equipment; leases offer additional flexibility in this area, and have made airlines increasingly less sensitive to cost and revenue fluctuations, although some sensitivity still exists.

=== Operating leasing ===
Commercial aircraft are often leased through a Commercial Aircraft Sales and Leasing (CASL) company, the two largest of which are International Lease Finance Corporation (ILFC) and GE Commercial Aviation Services (GECAS).

Operating leases are generally short-term (less than 10 years in duration), making them attractive when aircraft are needed for a start-up venture, or for the tentative expansion of an established carrier. The short duration of an operating lease also protects against aircraft obsolescence, an important consideration in many countries due to changing noise and environmental laws. In some countries where airlines may be deemed less creditworthy (e.g. the former Soviet Union), operating leases may be the only way for an airline to acquire aircraft. Moreover, it provides the flexibility to the airlines so that they can manage fleet size and composition as closely as possible, expanding and contracting to match demand.

Conversely, the aircraft's residual value at the end of the lease is an important consideration for the owner. The owner may require that the aircraft be returned in the same maintenance condition (e.g. post-C check) as it was delivered, so as to expedite turnaround to the next operator. Like leases in other fields, a security deposit is often required.

One particular type of operating lease is the wet lease, in which the aircraft is leased together with its crew. Such leases are generally on a short-term basis to cover bursts in demand, such as the Hajj pilgrimage. Unlike a charter flight, a wet-leased aircraft operates as part of the leasing carrier's fleet and with that carrier's airline code, although it often retains the livery of its owner.

US and UK accounting rules differ regarding operating leases. In the UK, some operating lease expenses can be capitalized on the company's balance sheet; in the US, operating lease expenses are generally reported as operating expenses, similarly to fuel or wages.

A related concept to the operating lease is the leaseback, in which the operator sells its own aircraft for cash, and then leases the same aircraft back from the purchaser for a periodic payment. The operating lease can afford the airlines flexibility to change their fleet size, and create a burden to the leasing companies.

=== Finance leasing ===
Finance leasing, also known as "capital leasing", is a longer-term arrangement in which the operator comes closer to effectively "owning" the aircraft. It involves a more complicated transaction in which a lessor, often a special purpose company (SPC) or partnership, purchases the aircraft through a combination of debt and equity financing, and then leases it to the operator. The operator may have the option to purchase the aircraft at the expiration of the lease, or may automatically receive the aircraft at the expiration of the lease.

Under American and British accounting rules, a finance lease is generally defined as one in which the lessor receives substantially all rights of ownership, or in which the present value of the minimum lease payments for the duration of the lease exceeds 90% of the fair market value of the aircraft. If a lease is defined as a finance lease, it must be counted as an asset of the company, in contrast to an operating lease which only affects the company's cash flow.

Finance leasing is attractive to the lessee because the lessee may claim depreciation deductions over the aircraft's useful life, which offset the profits from the lease for tax purposes, and deduct interest paid to those creditors who financed the purchase. This has made aircraft a popular form of tax shelter for investors, and has also made finance leasing a cheaper alternative to operating leases or secured purchasing.

The various forms of finance leasing include:

- Equipment trust certificate (ETC): Most commonly used in North America. A trust of investors purchases the aircraft and then "leases" it to the operator, on condition that the airline will receive title upon full performance of the lease. ETCs blur the line between finance leasing and secured lending, and in their most recent forms have begun to resemble securitization arrangements.
- Extendible operating lease: Although an EOL resembles a finance lease, the lessee generally has the option to terminate the lease at specified points (e.g. every three years); thus, the lease can also be conceptualized as an operating lease. Whether EOLs qualify as operating leases depends on the timing of the termination right and the accounting rules applicable to the companies.
- US leveraged lease: Used by foreign airlines importing aircraft from the United States. In a US lease, a Foreign Sales Corporation (FSC) purchases and leases the aircraft, and is tax-exempt so long as at least 50% of the aircraft is made in the US, and at least 50% of its flight miles are flown outside the US. Because of the extensive documentation required for these leases, they have only been used for very expensive aircraft being operated entirely outside the US, such as Boeing 747s purchased for domestic routes within Japan.
- Japanese leveraged lease: A JLL requires the establishment of a special purpose company to acquire the aircraft, and at least 20% of the equity in the company must be held by Japanese nationals. Widebody aircraft are leased for 12 years, while narrowbody aircraft are leased for 10 years. Under a JLL, the airline receives tax deductions in its home country, and the Japanese investors are exempt from taxation on their investment. JLLs were encouraged in the early 1990s as a form of re-exporting currency generated by Japan's trade surplus.
- Hong Kong leveraged lease: In Hong Kong, where income taxes are low in comparison to other countries, leveraged leasing to local operators is common. In such transactions, a locally incorporated lessor acquires an aircraft through a combination of non-recourse debt, recourse debt, and equity (generally in a 49-16-35 proportion), and thus be able to claim depreciation allowances despite only being liable for half of the purchase price. Its high tax losses can then be set off against profits from leasing the aircraft to a local carrier. Due to local tax laws, these investments are set up as general partnerships, in which the investors' liability is mainly limited by insurance and by contract with the operator.

=== Corporate trust lease ===
Some U.S. banks hold an aircraft "in trust" to protect the privacy of the true "owners" of the aircraft or to "secure U.S. registration of aircraft for non-U.S. citizen corporations and individuals".

== See also ==
- Option (aircraft purchasing)
