= Cash flow loan =

A cash flow loan is a type of debt financing, in which a bank lends funds, generally for working capital, using the expected cash flows that a borrowing company generates as collateral for the loan. Cashflow loans are usually senior term loans or subordinated debt, being used for funding growth or financing an acquisition.

To secure repayment, the bank imposes covenants on a borrower on such levels and ratios as enterprise value, EBITDA, total interest coverage ratio, total debt/EBITDA, and so on. They will also take a charge over the assets of the business to provide the lender with the ability to take control of the cash flows in the event of default.

In contrast, an asset-based loan is lent against company's assets. A senior stretch loan is the combination of the two.

== See also ==
- Asset-based loan
- Senior stretch loan
- Seniority (finance)
