= Solar cell fabric =

Fabric that generates electricity with light

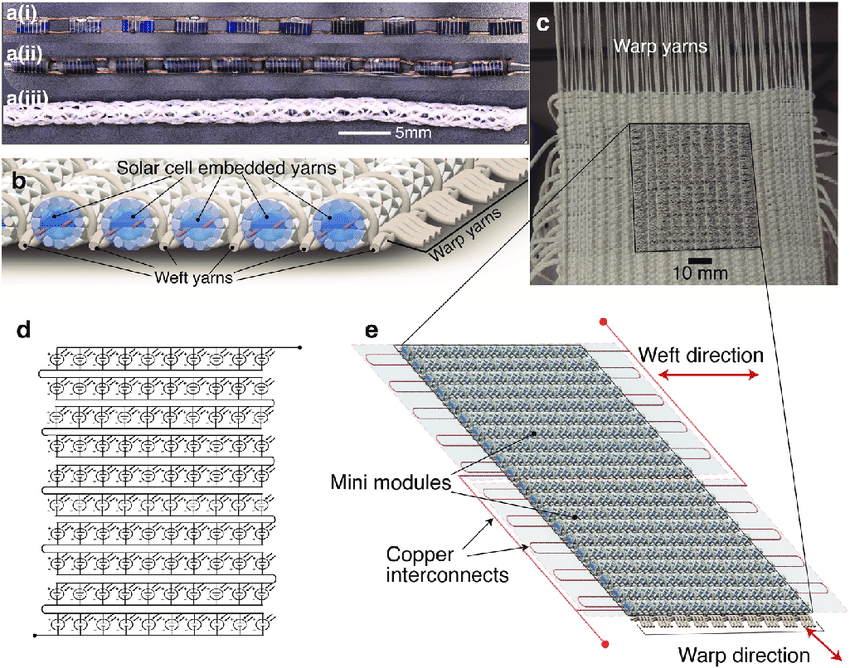
Structure of solar cell embedded fabric demonstrator

Solar cell fabric refers to textiles that have integrated photovoltaic (PV) cells, enabling them to generate electricity when exposed to light. This integration can be achieved by embedding small-scale solar cells within textile yarns, which are then woven into a fabric, or by applying flexible photovoltaic films and coatings onto planar textiles.

Traditional silicon-based solar cells are expensive to manufacture, rigid, and fragile. Although less efficient, thin-film cells and organic polymer-based cells can be produced quickly and cheaply. They are also flexible and can be stitched onto fabric.

According to an article from New Scientist, researchers have built a photovoltaic cell in the layers around a fiber, creating a tiny cylindrical cell. No longer limited to rooftops and poles, solar collection could work silently and unobtrusively from everyday objects.

== Methods and Integration Strategies ==
Several methods exist for incorporating solar technology into fabrics. The simplest approach is by integrating flexible solar panels with textiles. Fiber integration is a more advanced method where photovoltaic materials are seamlessly embedded directly into individual fibers. These specially designed fibers can then be woven, knitted, or incorporated into textiles, creating a fully integrated solar fabric that maintains flexibility, durability, and energy-harvesting capabilities. This method ensures that the fabric retains its flexibility and drape, making it particularly suitable for wearable applications.

Another approach involves surface attachment, where flexible solar panels—such as those made from copper indium gallium selenide (CIGS)—are affixed to the outer layer of textiles. This technique has been widely used in consumer products such as solar backpacks and jackets, enabling users to harness solar energy while on the move.

== Limitations ==
While flexible solar cells offer greater versatility, their power conversion efficiency is typically lower than that of rigid silicon-based solar cells. This lower efficiency can limit the energy output of solar fabrics, making them less competitive in applications where space and efficiency are critical.

The mechanical stability and longevity of solar cell fabrics are also concerns. The inherent flexibility of textiles, along with mechanical stress, environmental exposure, and repeated use, can lead to degradation of photovoltaic materials over time.

== Recent Research ==
Recent advancements in solar cell fabrics have focused on improving efficiency, flexibility, and integration techniques. In Japan, a $1.5 billion investment has been directed toward developing ultra-thin, flexible perovskite solar panels. These panels are 20 times thinner than traditional ones and can be applied to various surfaces, including textiles, making them ideal for diverse energy generation applications.

In the consumer market, Anker introduced the Solix Solar Beach Umbrella in January 2025, featuring advanced perovskite solar cells. These cells provide up to 100W of output and offer 30% better performance in bright light and double the efficiency in low-light conditions compared to traditional silicon-based solar cells.

Researchers at MIT have developed scalable fabrication techniques for producing ultrathin, lightweight solar cells that can be integrated onto almost any surface, including fabrics. These cells are significantly lighter than traditional solar panels while still generating substantial power, making them ideal for wearable applications.

Additionally, the Johns Hopkins Applied Physics Laboratory has pioneered methods to develop battery- and solar-powered fibers. This breakthrough enables textiles to incorporate both energy-harvesting and storage capabilities, paving the way for wearable electronics powered by solar energy.

== Optimal Use Cases ==
Solar cell fabrics are particularly beneficial in environments where traditional power sources are unavailable or where mobility is essential.

- Space Exploration: Integrating solar fabrics into spacesuits or habitats can provide astronauts with a reliable, independent power source for extended missions.
- Military Operations: Solar-powered textiles can supply energy for communication devices and essential equipment, improving operational efficiency in remote locations.
