= Regulation AB =

Regulation AB consolidates and codifies existing interpretative, primarily client-specific, positions that clarify Securities Act of 1933 registration requirements for asset-backed securities offerings in the United States. Regulation AB:

- updates and clarifies the registration requirements for ABS offerings under the Securities Act;
- provides disclosure guidance and requirements for filings involving ABS under the Securities Act and Exchange Act;
- establishes a consistent servicing standard, used as the basis for measuring;
- requires an accountant's report for each servicer assertion.
