= Senior stretch loan =

A senior stretch loan, or overadvance loan, is a hybrid debt instrument consisting of both asset-based loan and cash flow loan.

== Borrowers ==
Such loans are suitable for two types of companies:

- Companies that have substantial asset base but do not have stable or predictable cash flows. For example, troubled or turnaround companies. Cash flow loans would be much smaller and more expensive for these companies.
- Companies with healthy cash flows but lower assets. In this case, a pure asset-based loan would be insufficient.

For both types, the senior stretch debt structure takes advantage of the combination of the company's assets and cash flow to make significantly more debt available than would have been otherwise.

== See also ==
- Seniority (finance)
- Term loan
