= Panel generation factor =

Panel generation factor (PGF) is used while calculating the size of solar photovoltaic cells. It is a varying factor depending upon the climate of the site location (depending upon global geographic location).

For example, in Thailand it is 3.43, in EU countries it is 2.93, etc. This factor is used in calculation of "Total Watt-Peak Rating" while designing the size of solar photovoltaic cells.

Therefore, "Total Watt-Peak Rating" = "Total Watt-hours per day needed/generated from the PV modules" divided by "PGF". "Total Watt-Hours per Day" = "Total Watt-hours per day needed by appliances" Multiplied by "1.3 times" (the energy lost in the system). Now, to calculate "size of PV cells" OR "number of PV cells" just divide the above obtained "Total Watt-Peak Rating" by "Watt-Peak of each cell OR Watt-Peak of each square meter size", whichever is convenient.
