= Securitization =

Financial engineering practice

Securitization is the financial practice of pooling contractual debt obligations (such as residential mortgages, commercial mortgages, auto loans, or credit card debt) and selling their associated cash flows to investors. The financial instruments sold in such transactions are known as securities, types of which include bonds, pass-through securities, and collateralized debt obligations (CDOs). Investors are repaid from the principal and interest cash flows collected from the underlying debt and redistributed through the capital structure of the new financing. Securities backed by mortgage receivables are called mortgage-backed securities (MBS), while those backed by other types of receivables are asset-backed securities (ABS).

The granularity of pools of securitized assets can mitigate the credit risk of individual borrowers. Unlike general corporate debt, the credit quality of securitized debt is non-stationary due to changes in volatility that are time- and structure-dependent. If the transaction is properly structured and the pool performs as expected, the credit risk of all tranches of structured debt improves; if improperly structured, the affected tranches may experience dramatic credit deterioration and loss.

Securitization has evolved from its beginnings in the late 18th century to an estimated outstanding of $10.24 trillion in the United States and $2.25 trillion in Europe as of the 2nd quarter of 2008. In 2007, asset-backed security issuance amounted to $3.455 trillion in the US and $652 billion in Europe. WBS (Whole Business Securitization) arrangements first appeared in the United Kingdom in the 1990s, and became common in various Commonwealth legal systems where senior creditors of an insolvent business effectively gain the right to control the company.

== Structure ==
=== Pooling and transfer ===
The originator initially owns the assets engaged in the deal. This is typically a company looking to either raise capital, restructure debt or otherwise adjust its finances (but also includes businesses established specifically to generate marketable debt (consumer or otherwise) for the purpose of subsequent securitization). Under traditional corporate finance concepts, such a company would have three options to raise new capital: a loan, bond issue, or issuance of stock. However, stock offerings dilute the ownership and control of the company, while loan or bond financing is often prohibitively expensive due to the credit rating of the company and the associated rise in interest rates.

The consistently revenue-generating part of the company may have a much higher credit rating than the company as a whole. For instance, a leasing company may have provided $10m nominal value of leases, and it will receive a cash flow over the next five years from these. It cannot demand early repayment on the leases and so cannot get its money back early if required. If it could sell the rights to the cash flows from the leases to someone else, it could transform that income stream into a lump sum today (in effect, receiving today the present value of a future cash flow). Where the originator is a bank or other organization that must meet capital adequacy requirements, the structure is usually more complex because a separate company is set up to buy the assets.

A suitably large portfolio of assets is "pooled" and transferred to a "special purpose vehicle" or "SPV" (the issuer), a tax-exempt company or trust formed for the specific purpose of funding the assets. Once the assets are transferred to the issuer, there is normally no recourse to the originator. The issuer is "bankruptcy remote", meaning that if the originator goes into bankruptcy, the assets of the issuer will not be distributed to the creditors of the originator. In order to achieve this, the governing documents of the issuer restrict its activities to only those necessary to complete the issuance of securities. Many issuers are typically "orphaned". In the case of certain assets, such as credit card debt, where the portfolio is made up of a constantly changing pool of receivables, a trust in favor of the SPV may be declared in place of traditional transfer by assignment (see the outline of the master trust structure below).

Accounting standards govern when such a transfer is a true sale, a financing, a partial sale, or a part-sale and part-financing. In a true sale, the originator is allowed to remove the transferred assets from its balance sheet: in a financing, the assets are considered to remain the property of the originator. Under US accounting standards, the originator achieves a sale by being at arm's length from the issuer, in which case the issuer is classified as a "qualifying special purpose entity" or "qSPE".

Because of these structural issues, the originator typically needs the help of an investment bank (the arranger) in setting up the structure of the transaction.

=== Issuance ===
To be able to buy the assets from the originator, the issuer SPV issues tradable securities to fund the purchase. Investors purchase the securities, either through a private offering (targeting institutional investors) or on the open market. The performance of the securities is then directly linked to the performance of the assets. Credit rating agencies rate the securities which are issued to provide an external perspective on the liabilities being created and help the investor make a more informed decision.

In transactions with static assets, a depositor will assemble the underlying collateral, help structure the securities and work with the financial markets to sell the securities to investors. The depositor has taken on added significance under Regulation AB. The depositor typically owns 100% of the beneficial interest in the issuing entity and is usually the parent or a wholly owned subsidiary of the parent which initiates the transaction. In transactions with managed (traded) assets, asset managers assemble the underlying collateral, help structure the securities and work with the financial markets in order to sell the securities to investors.

Some deals may include a third-party guarantor which provides guarantees or partial guarantees for the assets, the principal and the interest payments, for a fee.

The securities can be issued with either a fixed interest rate or a floating rate under currency pegging system. Fixed rate ABS set the "coupon" (rate) at the time of issuance, in a fashion similar to corporate bonds and T-Bills. Floating rate securities may be backed by both amortizing and non-amortizing assets in the floating market. In contrast to fixed rate securities, the rates on "floaters" will periodically adjust up or down according to a designated index such as a U.S. Treasury rate, or, more typically, the London Interbank Offered Rate (LIBOR). The floating rate usually reflects the movement in the index plus an additional fixed margin to cover the added risk.

=== Credit enhancement and tranching ===
Unlike conventional corporate bonds which are unsecured, securities created in a securitization are "credit enhanced", meaning their credit quality is increased above that of the originator's unsecured debt or underlying asset pool. This increases the likelihood that the investors will receive the cash flows to which they are entitled, and thus enables the securities to have a higher credit rating than the originator. Some securitizations use external credit enhancement provided by third parties, such as surety bonds and parental guarantees (although this may introduce a conflict of interest).

The issued securities are often split into tranches, or categorized into varying degrees of subordination. Each tranche has a different level of credit protection or risk exposure: there is generally a senior ("A") class of securities and one or more junior subordinated ("B", "C", etc.) classes that function as protective layers for the "A" class. The senior classes have first claim on the cash that the SPV receives, and the more junior classes only start receiving repayment after the more senior classes have been repaid. Because of the cascading effect between classes, this arrangement is often referred to as a cash flow waterfall. If the underlying asset pool becomes insufficient to make payments on the securities (e.g. when loans default within a portfolio of loan claims), the loss is absorbed first by the subordinated tranches, and the upper-level tranches remain unaffected until the losses exceed the entire amount of the subordinated tranches. The senior securities might be AAA or AA rated, signifying a lower risk, while the lower-credit quality subordinated classes receive a lower credit rating, signifying a higher risk.

The most junior class (often called the equity class) is the most exposed to payment risk. In some cases, this is a special type of instrument which is retained by the originator as a potential profit flow. In some cases the equity class receives no coupon (either fixed or floating), but only the residual cash flow (if any) after all the other classes have been paid.

There may also be a special class which absorbs early repayments in the underlying assets. This is often the case where the underlying assets are mortgages which, in essence, are repaid whenever the properties are sold. Since any early repayments are passed on to this class, it means the other investors have a more predictable cash flow.

If the underlying assets are mortgages or loans, there are usually two separate "waterfalls" because the principal and interest receipts can be easily allocated and matched. But if the assets are income-based transactions such as rental deals one cannot categorise the revenue so easily between income and principal repayment. In this case all the revenue is used to pay the cash flows due on the bonds as those cash flows become due.

Credit enhancements affect credit risk by providing more or less protection for promised cash flows for a security. Additional protection can help a security achieve a higher rating, lower protection can help create new securities with differently desired risks, and these differential protections can make the securities more attractive.

In addition to subordination, credit may be enhanced through:

- A reserve or spread account, in which funds remaining after expenses such as principal and interest payments, charge-offs and other fees have been paid-off are accumulated, and can be used when SPE expenses are greater than its income.
- Third-party insurance, or guarantees of principal and interest payments on the securities.
- Over-collateralisation, usually by using finance income to pay off principal on some securities before principal on the corresponding share of collateral is collected.
- Cash funding or a cash collateral account, generally consisting of short-term, highly rated investments purchased either from the seller's own funds, or from funds borrowed from third parties that can be used to make up shortfalls in promised cash flows.
- A third-party letter of credit or corporate guarantee.
- A back-up servicer for the loans.
- Discounted receivables for the pool.

=== Servicing ===
A servicer collects payments and monitors the assets that are the crux of the structured financial deal. The servicer can often be the originator, because the servicer needs very similar expertise to the originator and would want to ensure that loan repayments are paid to the Special Purpose Vehicle.

The servicer can significantly affect the cash flows to the investors because it controls the collection policy, which influences the proceeds collected, the charge-offs and the recoveries on the loans. Any income remaining after payments and expenses is usually accumulated to some extent in a reserve or spread account, and any further excess is returned to the seller. Bond rating agencies publish ratings of asset-backed securities based on the performance of the collateral pool, the credit enhancements and the probability of default.

When the issuer is structured as a trust, the trustee is a vital part of the deal as the gate-keeper of the assets that are being held in the issuer. Even though the trustee is part of the SPV, which is typically wholly owned by the Originator, the trustee has a fiduciary duty to protect the assets and those who own the assets, typically the investors.

=== Repayment structures ===
Unlike corporate bonds, most securitizations are amortized, meaning that the principal amount borrowed is paid back gradually over the specified term of the loan, rather than in one lump sum at the maturity of the loan. Fully amortizing securitizations are generally collateralised by fully amortizing assets, such as home equity loans, auto loans, and student loans. Prepayment uncertainty is an important concern with fully amortizing ABS. The possible rate of prepayment varies widely with the type of underlying asset pool, so many prepayment models have been developed to try to define common prepayment activity. The PSA prepayment model is a well-known example.

A controlled amortization structure can give investors a more predictable repayment schedule, even though the underlying assets may be nonamortising. After a predetermined "revolving period", during which only interest payments are made, these securitizations attempt to return principal to investors in a series of defined periodic payments, usually within a year. An early amortization event is the risk of the debt being retired early.

On the other hand, bullet or slug structures return the principal to investors in a single payment. The most common bullet structure is called the soft bullet, meaning that the final bullet payment is not guaranteed to be paid on the scheduled maturity date; however, the majority of these securitizations are paid on time. The second type of bullet structure is the hard bullet, which guarantees that the principal will be paid on the scheduled maturity date. Hard bullet structures are less common for two reasons: investors are comfortable with soft bullet structures, and they are reluctant to accept the lower yields of hard bullet securities in exchange for a guarantee.

Securitizations are often structured as a sequential pay bond, paid off in a sequential manner based on maturity. This means that the first tranche, which may have a one-year average life, will receive all principal payments until it is retired; then the second tranche begins to receive principal, and so forth. Pro rata bond structures pay each tranche a proportionate share of principal throughout the life of the security.

=== Structural risks and misincentives ===
Some originators (e.g. of mortgages) have prioritised loan volume over credit quality, disregarding the long-term risk of the assets they have created in their enthusiasm to profit from the fees associated with origination and securitization. Other originators, aware of the reputational harm and added expense if risky loans are subject to repurchase requests or improperly originated loans lead to litigation, have paid more attention to credit quality.

== Special types of securitization ==
=== Master trust ===
A master trust is a type of SPV particularly suited to handle revolving credit card balances, and has the flexibility to handle different securities at different times. In a typical master trust transaction, an originator of credit card receivables transfers a pool of those receivables to the trust and then the trust issues securities backed by these receivables. Often there will be many tranched securities issued by the trust all based on one set of receivables. After this transaction, typically the originator would continue to service the receivables, in this case the credit cards.

There are various risks involved with master trusts specifically. One risk is that timing of cash flows promised to investors might be different from timing of payments on the receivables. For example, credit card-backed securities can have maturities of up to 10 years, but credit card-backed receivables usually pay off much more quickly. To solve this issue these securities typically have a revolving period, an accumulation period, and an amortization period. All three of these periods are based on historical experience of the receivables. During the revolving period, principal payments received on the credit card balances are used to purchase additional receivables. During the accumulation period, these payments are accumulated in a separate account. During the amortization period, new payments are passed through to the investors.

A second risk is that the total investor interests and the seller's interest are limited to receivables generated by the credit cards, but the seller (originator) owns the accounts. This can cause issues with how the seller controls the terms and conditions of the accounts. Typically to solve this, there is language written into the securitization to protect the investors and potential receivables.

A third risk is that payments on the receivables can shrink the pool balance and under-collateralize total investor interest. To prevent this, often there is a required minimum seller's interest, and if there was a decrease then an early amortization event would occur.

=== Issuance trust ===
In 2000, Citibank introduced a new structure for credit card-backed securities, called an issuance trust, which does not have limitations that master trusts sometimes do, that requires each issued series of securities to have both a senior and subordinate tranche. There are other benefits to an issuance trust: they provide more flexibility in issuing senior/subordinate securities, can increase demand because pension funds are eligible to invest in investment-grade securities issued by them, and they can significantly reduce the cost of issuing securities. Because of these issues, issuance trusts are now the dominant structure used by major issuers of credit card-backed securities.

=== Grantor trust ===
Grantor trusts are typically used in automobile-backed securities and REMICs (Real Estate Mortgage Investment Conduits). Grantor trusts are very similar to pass-through trusts used in the earlier days of securitization. An originator pools together loans and sells them to a grantor trust, which issues classes of securities backed by these loans. Principal and interest received on the loans, after expenses are taken into account, are passed through to the holders of the securities on a pro-rata basis.

=== Owner trust ===
In an owner trust, there is more flexibility in allocating principal and interest received to different classes of issued securities. In an owner trust, both interest and principal due to subordinate securities can be used to pay senior securities. Due to this, owner trusts can tailor maturity, risk and return profiles of issued securities to investor needs. Usually, any income remaining after expenses is kept in a reserve account up to a specified level and then after that, all income is returned to the seller. Owner trusts allow credit risk to be mitigated by over-collateralization by using excess reserves and excess finance income to prepay securities before principal, which leaves more collateral for the other classes.

== Motives for securitization ==
=== Advantages to Originator ===
Reduces funding costs: Through securitization, a company rated BB but with AAA worthy cash flow would be able to borrow at possibly AAA rates. This is the number one reason to securitize a cash flow and can have tremendous impacts on borrowing costs. The difference between BB debt and AAA debt can be multiple hundreds of basis points. For example, Moody's downgraded Ford Motor Credit's rating in January 2002, but senior automobile backed securities, issued by Ford Motor Credit in January 2002 and April 2002, continue to be rated AAA because of the strength of the underlying collateral and other credit enhancements.

Reduces asset-liability mismatch: "Depending on the structure chosen, securitization can offer perfect matched funding by eliminating funding exposure in terms of both duration and pricing basis." Essentially, in most banks and finance companies, the liability book or the funding is from borrowings. This often comes at a high cost. Securitization allows such banks and finance companies to create a self-funded asset book.

Lower capital requirements: Some firms, due to legal, regulatory, or other reasons, have a limit or range that their leverage is allowed to be. By securitizing some of their assets, which qualifies as a sale for accounting purposes, these firms will be able to remove assets from their balance sheets while maintaining the "earning power" of the assets.

Locking in profits: For a given block of business, the total profits have not yet emerged and thus remain uncertain. Once the block has been securitized, the level of profits has now been locked in for that company, thus the risk of profit not emerging, or the benefit of super-profits, has now been passed on.

Transfer risks (credit, liquidity, prepayment, reinvestment, asset concentration): Securitization makes it possible to transfer risks from an entity that does not want to bear it, to one that does. Two good examples of this are catastrophe bonds and Entertainment Securitizations. Similarly, by securitizing a block of business (thereby locking in a degree of profits), the company has effectively freed up its balance to go out and write more profitable business.

Off balance sheet: Derivatives of many types have in the past been referred to as "off-balance-sheet". This term implies that the use of derivatives has no balance sheet impact. While there are differences among the various accounting standards internationally, there is a general trend towards the requirement to record derivatives at fair value on the balance sheet. There is also a generally accepted principle that, where derivatives are being used as a hedge against underlying assets or liabilities, accounting adjustments are required to ensure that the gain/loss on the hedged instrument is recognized in the income statement on a similar basis as the underlying assets and liabilities. Certain credit derivatives products, particularly Credit Default Swaps, now have more or less universally accepted market standard documentation. In the case of Credit Default Swaps, this documentation has been formulated by the International Swaps and Derivatives Association (ISDA) who have for a long time provided documentation on how to treat such derivatives on balance sheets.

Earnings: Securitization makes it possible to record an earnings bounce without any real addition to the firm. When a securitization takes place, there often is a "true sale" that takes place between the Originator (the parent company) and the SPE. This sale has to be for the market value of the underlying assets for the "true sale" to stick and thus this sale is reflected on the parent company's balance sheet, which will boost earnings for that quarter by the amount of the sale. While not illegal in any respect, this does distort the true earnings of the parent company.

Admissibility: Future cashflows may not get full credit in a company's accounts (life insurance companies, for example, may not always get full credit for future surpluses in their regulatory balance sheet), and a securitization effectively turns an admissible future surplus flow into an admissible immediate cash asset.

Liquidity: Future cashflows may simply be balance sheet items which currently are not available for spending, whereas once the book has been securitized, the cash would be available for immediate spending or investment. This also creates a reinvestment book which may well be at better rates.

=== Disadvantages to originator ===
May reduce portfolio quality: If the AAA risks, for example, are being securitized out, this would leave a materially worse quality of residual risk.

Costs: Securitizations are expensive due to management and system costs, legal fees, underwriting fees, rating fees and ongoing administration. An allowance for unforeseen costs is usually essential in securitizations, especially if it is an atypical securitization.

Size limitations: Securitizations often require large scale structuring, and thus may not be cost-efficient for small and medium transactions.

Risks: Since securitization is a structured transaction, it may include par structures as well as credit enhancements that are subject to risks of impairment, such as prepayment, as well as credit loss, especially for structures where there are some retained strips.

=== Advantages to investors ===
Opportunity to potentially earn a higher rate of return (on a risk-adjusted basis)

Opportunity to invest in a specific pool of high quality assets: Due to the stringent requirements for corporations (for example) to attain high ratings, there is a dearth of highly rated entities that exist. Securitizations, however, allow for the creation of large quantities of AAA, AA or A rated bonds, and risk averse institutional investors, or investors that are required to invest in only highly rated assets, have access to a larger pool of investment options.

Portfolio diversification: Depending on the securitization, hedge funds as well as other institutional investors tend to like investing in bonds created through securitizations because they may be uncorrelated to their other bonds and securities.

Isolation of credit risk from the parent entity: Since the assets that are securitized are isolated (at least in theory) from the assets of the originating entity, under securitization it may be possible for the securitization to receive a higher credit rating than the "parent", because the underlying risks are different. For example, a small bank may be considered more risky than the mortgage loans it makes to its customers; were the mortgage loans to remain with the bank, the borrowers may effectively be paying higher interest (or, just as likely, the bank would be paying higher interest to its creditors, and hence less profitable).

=== Risks to investors ===
Liquidity risk

Credit/default: Default risk is generally accepted as a borrower's inability to meet interest payment obligations on time. For ABS, default may occur when maintenance obligations on the underlying collateral are not sufficiently met as detailed in its prospectus. A key indicator of a particular security's default risk is its credit rating. Different tranches within the ABS are rated differently, with senior classes of most issues receiving the highest rating, and subordinated classes receiving correspondingly lower credit ratings. Almost all mortgages, including reverse mortgages, and student loans, are now insured by the government, meaning that taxpayers are on the hook for any of these loans that go bad even if the asset is massively over-inflated. In other words, there are no limits or curbs on over-spending, or the liabilities to taxpayers.

However, the credit crisis of 2007–2008 has exposed a potential flaw in the securitization process—loan originators retain no residual risk for the loans they make, but collect substantial fees on loan issuance and securitization, which does not encourage improvement of underwriting standards.

Event risk

Prepayment/reinvestment/early amortization: The majority of revolving ABS are subject to some degree of early amortization risk. The risk stems from specific early amortization events or payout events that cause the security to be paid off prematurely. Typically, payout events include insufficient payments from the underlying borrowers, insufficient excess spread, a rise in the default rate on the underlying loans above a specified level, a decrease in credit enhancements below a specific level, and bankruptcy on the part of the sponsor or servicer.

Currency interest rate fluctuations: Like all fixed income securities, the prices of fixed rate ABS move in response to changes in interest rates. Fluctuations in interest rates affect floating rate ABS prices less than fixed rate securities, as the index against which the ABS rate adjusts will reflect interest rate changes in the economy. Furthermore, interest rate changes may affect the prepayment rates on underlying loans that back some types of ABS, which can affect yields. Home equity loans tend to be the most sensitive to changes in interest rates, while auto loans, student loans, and credit cards are generally less sensitive to interest rates.

Contractual agreements

Moral hazard: Investors usually rely on the deal manager to price the securitizations' underlying assets. If the manager earns fees based on performance, there may be a temptation to mark up the prices of the portfolio assets. Conflicts of interest can also arise with senior note holders when the manager has a claim on the deal's excess spread.

Servicer risk: The transfer or collection of payments may be delayed or reduced if the servicer becomes insolvent. This risk is mitigated by having a backup servicer involved in the transaction.

== History ==
Among the early examples of mortgage-backed securities in the United States were the farm railroad mortgage bonds of the mid-19th century which contributed to the panic of 1857.

In February 1970, the U.S. Department of Housing and Urban Development created the first modern residential mortgage-backed security. The Government National Mortgage Association (GNMA or Ginnie Mae) sold securities backed by a portfolio of mortgage loans.

To facilitate the securitization of non-mortgage assets, businesses substituted private credit enhancements. First, they over-collateralised pools of assets; shortly thereafter, they improved third-party and structural enhancements. In 1985, securitization techniques that had been developed in the mortgage market were applied for the first time to a class of non-mortgage assets—automobile loans. A pool of assets second only to mortgages in volume, auto loans were a good match for structured finance; their maturities, considerably shorter than those of mortgages, made the timing of cash flows more predictable, and their long statistical histories of performance gave investors confidence.

This early auto loan deal was a $60 million (~$148 million in 2024) securitization originated by Marine Midland Bank and securitised in 1985 by the Certificate for Automobile Receivables Trust (CARS, 1985–1).

The first significant bank credit card sale came to market in 1986 with a private placement of $50 million (~$121 million in 2024) of outstanding bank card loans. This transaction demonstrated to investors that, if the yields were high enough, loan pools could support asset sales with higher expected losses and administrative costs than was true within the mortgage market. Sales of this type—with no contractual obligation by the seller to provide recourse—allowed banks to receive sales treatment for accounting and regulatory purposes (easing balance sheet and capital constraints), while at the same time allowing them to retain origination and servicing fees. After the success of this initial transaction, investors grew to accept credit card receivables as collateral, and banks developed structures to normalize the cash flows.

Starting in the 1990s with some earlier private transactions, securitization technology was applied to a number of sectors of the reinsurance and insurance markets including life and catastrophe. This activity grew to nearly $15bn (~$22.4 billion in 2024) of issuance in 2006 following the disruptions in the underlying markets caused by Hurricane Katrina and Regulation XXX. Key areas of activity in the broad area of alternative risk transfer include catastrophe bonds, Life Insurance Securitization and reinsurance sidecars.

The first public Securitization of Community Reinvestment Act (CRA) loans started in 1997. CRA loans are loans targeted to low and moderate income borrowers and neighborhoods.

As estimated by the Bond Market Association, in the United States, the total amount outstanding at the end of 2004 was $1.8 (~$2.86 trillion in 2024) trillion. This amount was about 8 percent of total outstanding bond market debt ($23.6 trillion), about 33 percent of mortgage-related debt ($5.5 trillion), and about 39 percent of corporate debt ($4.7 trillion) in the United States. In nominal terms, over the previous ten years (1995–2004) ABS amount outstanding had grown about 19 percent annually, with mortgage-related debt and corporate debt each growing at about 9 percent. Gross public issuance of asset-backed securities was strong, setting new records in many years. In 2004, issuance was at an all-time record of about $0.9 trillion.

At the end of 2004, the larger sectors of this market were credit card-backed securities (21 percent), home-equity backed securities (25 percent), automobile-backed securities (13 percent), and collateralized debt obligations (15 percent). Among the other market segments were student loan-backed securities (6 percent), equipment leases (4 percent), manufactured housing (2 percent), small business loans (such as loans to convenience stores and gas stations), and aircraft leases.

Modern securitization took off in the late 1990s or early 2000s, thanks to the innovative structures implemented across the asset classes, such as UK Mortgage Master Trusts (concept imported from the US Credit Cards), Insurance-backed transaction (such as those implemented by the insurance securitization guru Emmanuel Issanchou) or even more esoteric asset classes (for example securitization of lottery receivables).

As the result of the credit crunch precipitated by the subprime mortgage crisis the US market for bonds backed by securitised loans was very weak in 2008 except for bonds guaranteed by a federally backed agency. As a result, interest rates rose for loans that were previously securitised such as home mortgages, student loans, auto loans and commercial mortgages.

=== Green securitization in the EU ===
In recent years there has been a growing debate in the European Union on the merits of developing securitization for green lending assets, such as renovation loans, mortgages or loans for electric vehicles.

=== Recent lawsuits ===
Recently there have been several lawsuits attributable to the rating of securitizations by the three leading rating agencies. In July, 2009, the US's largest public pension fund has filed suit in California state court in connection with $1 billion (~$1.42 billion in 2024) in losses that it says were caused by "wildly inaccurate" credit ratings from the three leading ratings agencies.

== See also ==
- Collateralized debt obligation, securitization vehicle for corporate debt securities
- Collateralized fund obligation, securitization vehicle for private equity and hedge fund assets
- Collateralized mortgage obligation, securitization vehicle for mortgage-backed securities
- Collateralized loan obligation, securitization vehicle for corporate loans
- Strip financing
