= Form S-3 =

Form S-3 is the most simplified securities registration form used by the U.S. Securities and Exchange Commission. It may only be used by companies that have been required to report under the Securities Exchange Act of 1934 for a minimum of twelve months and have also timely filed all required reports (including annual forms 10-K, quarterly forms 10-Q and certain current forms 8-K) under the Securities Exchange Act of 1934 during the twelve calendar months and any portion of a month immediately before the filing of the registration statement. Also, the offering and the issuer must meet other eligibility tests prescribed by the form.
