= Receivables =

Receivables may refer to:

- Notes receivable, claims for which formal instruments of credit are issued as evidence of debt
- Receivables turnover ratio, a financial ratio

== See also ==
- Receivable
