= Venture round =

Type of funding round

A venture round is a type of funding round used for venture capital financing, by which startup companies obtain investment, generally from venture capitalists and other institutional investors. The availability of venture funding is among the primary stimuli for the development of new companies and technologies.

== Features ==
=== Parties ===
- Founders or stakeholders. Introduce companies to investors.
- A lead investor, typically the best known or most aggressive venture capital firm that is participating in the investment, or the one contributing the largest amount of cash. The lead investor typically oversees most of the negotiation, legal work, due diligence, and other formalities of the investment. It may also introduce the company to other investors, generally in an informal unpaid capacity.
- Co-investors, other major investors who contribute alongside the lead investor.
- Follow-on or piggyback investors. Typically angel investors, high-net worth individuals, family offices, institutional investors, and others who contribute money but take a passive role in the investment and company management.
- Law firms and accountants are typically retained by all parties to advise, negotiate, and document the transaction.

=== Stages in a venture round ===
- Introduction. Investors and companies seek each other out through formal and informal business networks, personal connections, paid or unpaid finders, researchers and advisers, and the like. Because there are no public exchanges listing their securities, private companies meet venture capital firms and other private equity investors in several ways, including warm referrals from the investors' trusted sources and other business contacts; investor conferences and symposia; and summits where companies pitch directly to investor groups in face-to-face meetings, including a variant known as "Speed Venturing", which is akin to speed dating for capital, where the investor decides within 10 minutes whether s/he wants a follow-up meeting.
- Offering. The company provides the investment firm a confidential business plan to secure initial interest.
- Private placement memorandum. A PPM/prospectus is generally not used in the Silicon Valley model.
- Negotiation of terms. Non-binding term sheets, letters of intent, and the like are exchanged back and forth as negotiation documents. Once the parties agree on terms, they sign the term sheet as an expression of commitment.
- Signed term sheet. These are usually non-binding and commit the parties only to good faith attempts to complete the transaction on specified terms, but may also contain some procedural promises of limited (30- to 60-day) duration like confidentiality, exclusivity on the part of the company (i.e. the company will not seek funding from other sources), and stand-still provisions (e.g. the company will not undertake any major business changes or enter agreements that would make the transaction infeasible).
- Definitive transaction documents. A drawn-out (usually 2–4 weeks) process of negotiating and drafting a series of contracts and other legal papers used to implement the transaction. In theory, these simply follow the terms of the term sheet. In practice they contain many important details that are beyond the scope of the major deal terms. Definitive transaction documents are not required in all situations. Specifically where the parties have entered into a separate agreement that does not require that the parties execute all such documents.
- Definitive documents, the legal papers that document the final transaction. Generally includes:

- Stock purchase agreements – the primary contract by which investors exchange money for newly minted shares of preferred stock
- Buy-sell agreements, co-sale agreements, right of first refusal, etc. – agreements by which company founders and other owners of common stock agree to limit their individual ability to sell their shares in favor of the new investors
- Investor rights agreements – covenants the company makes to the new investors, generally include promises with respect to board seats, negative covenants not to obtain additional financing, sell the company, or make other specified business and financial decisions without the investors' approval, and positive covenants such as inspection rights and promises to provide ongoing financial disclosures
- Amended and restated articles of incorporation – formalize issues like authorization and classes of shares and certain investor protections

- Due diligence. Simultaneously with negotiating the definitive agreements, the investors examine the financial statements and books and records of the company, and all aspects of its operations. They may require that certain matters be corrected before agreeing to the transaction, e.g. new employment contracts or stock vesting schedules for key executives. At the end of the process the company offers representations and warranties to the investors concerning the accuracy and sufficiency of the company's disclosures, as well as the existence of certain conditions (subject to enumerated exceptions), as part of the stock purchase agreement.
- Final agreement occurs when the parties execute all of the transaction documents. This is generally when the funding is announced and the deal considered complete, although there are often rumors and leaks.
- Closing occurs when the investors provide the funding and the company provides stock certificates to the investors. Ideally this would be simultaneous, and contemporaneous with the final agreement. However, conventions in the venture community are fairly lax with respect to timing and formality of closing, and generally depend on the goodwill of the parties and their attorneys. To reduce cost and speed up transactions, formalities common in other industries such as escrow of funds, signed original documents, and notarization, are rarely required. This creates some opportunity for incomplete and erroneous paperwork. Some transactions have "rolling closings" or multiple closing dates for different investors. Others are "tranched," meaning the investors only give part of the funds at a time, with the remainder disbursed over time subject to the company meeting specified milestones.
- Post-closing. After the closing a few things may occur:

- Conversion of convertible notes. If there are outstanding notes they may convert at or after closing.
- SEC filing with relevant state and/or federal regulators
- Filing of amended Articles of Incorporation
- Preparation of closing binder – contains documentation of entire transaction

=== Rights and privileges ===
Venture investors obtain special privileges that are not granted to holders of common stock. These are embodied in the various transaction documents. Common rights include:

- Anti-dilution protection – if the company ever sells a significant amount of stock at a price lower than the investor paid, then to protect investors against stock dilution they are issued additional shares (usually by changing the "conversion ratio" used to calculate their liquidation preference).
- Guaranteed board seats
- Positive and negative covenants by the company
- Registration right – the investors have special rights to demand registration of their stock on public exchanges, and to participate in an initial public offering and subsequent public offerings
- Representations and warranties as to the state of the company
- Liquidation preferences – in any liquidation event such as a merger or acquisition, the investors get their money back, often with interest and/or at a multiple, before common stock is paid any funds from liquidation. The preference may be "participating", in which case the investors get their preference and their proportionate share of the surplus, or "non-participating" in which case the preference is a floor.
- Dividends – dividend amounts are usually stated but not mandatory on the part of the company, except that the investors will get their dividends before any dividends may be declared for common stock. Most venture-backed start-ups are initially unprofitable so dividends are rarely paid. Unpaid dividends are generally forgiven but they may be accumulated and are added to the liquidation preference.

== Round names ==
Venture capital financing rounds typically have names relating to the class of stock being sold:

- A pre-seed or angel round is the earliest infusion of capital by founders, supporters, high net worth individuals ("angel investors"), and sometimes a small amount of institutional capital to launch the company, build a prototype, and discover initial product-market fit.
- Seed round is generally the first formal equity round with an institutional lead. The series seed can be priced, meaning investors purchase preferred stock at a valuation set by the lead investor, or take the form of convertible note or simple agreement for future equity that can be converted at a discount to preferred shares at the first priced round. A Seed round is often used to demonstrate market traction in preparation for the Series A. Although in the past seed rounds were mainly reserved for pre-revenue companies, as of 2019 two-thirds of companies raising seed rounds already had revenues.
- A priced equity round is often called Series A, with each subsequent round using the next letter in the alphabet (e.g. B, C, D). Generally, the progression and price of stock at these rounds is an indication that a company is progressing as expected. Investors may become concerned when a company has raised too much money in too many rounds, considering it a sign of delayed progress. Median round sizes rise with each successive stage; in 2024 the median United States seed round was about $3.1 million and the median Series A about $12.4 million.
- Series A', B', and so on indicate small follow-on or bridge funding rounds that are integrated into the preceding round, generally on the same terms, to raise additional funds.
- Series AA, BB, and so on once used to denote a new start after a crunchdown or downround, i.e. the company failed to meet its growth objectives and is essentially starting again under the umbrella of a new group of funders. Increasingly, however, Series AA Preferred Stock investment rounds are becoming used more widely along with convertible note financings or other "lightweight" preferred stock financings, such as "Series Seed" or "Series AA" preferred stock, to support less capital-intensive business growth, as their simplicity and generally lower legal costs can be attractive to early investors and founders.
- A pre-IPO round is a late-stage equity round for a private company to raise funds in advance of its listing on a public exchange. This allows both individual and institutional investors to invest in such late-stage, VC-backed private companies prior to its initial public offering (IPO).
- Mezzanine finance rounds, bridge loans, and other debt instruments used to support a company between venture rounds or before its initial public offering.

== Option pool shuffle ==
Option pool shuffle relates to the allocation of shares to a venture capital (VC) investor at the point of investment, when also creating an Employee Share Option Pool at the same time. There are two different approaches to determine the number of shares to allocate to each investor, the VC Friendly Approach and the Founder Friendly Approach.

=== The VC Friendly approach ===
The VC Friendly approach, which may also be called a pre-money pool, gives the VC a greater share of the company. The Share Options are allocated first, and then the VC is allocated its shares. The impact is the VC share allocation dilutes the Share Option Pool and the VC ends up with a greater percentage of the company

=== The Founder Friendly approach ===
The Founder Friendly approach, which may also be called a post-money pool, gives the VC a smaller share of the company. The VC are allocated their shares first. The impact is that the VC is diluted by the new Share Option Pool and the VC ends up with a smaller percentage of the company

=== Example ===
A company has 90,000 shares, and wants to (i) allocate 18,000 shares to a VC and (ii) create an Employee Share Option Pool (ESOP) of 10%.

The VC Friendly approach:

1. The ESOP is created first – allocating 10% of the Company. So the ESOP gets 10,000 shares (10,000 / 100,000)
2. The VC is allocated its shares – 18,000 shares. The VC ends up with 15.25% of the company (18,000 / 118,000)
3. The ESOP ends up with 8.47% of the company (10,000/118,000)

The Founder Friendly approach:

1. The VC is allocated its shares – 18,000 shares.
2. The ESOP is created. There are now 108,000 shares outstanding, so the ESOP gets 12,000 shares, and has 10% of the company (12,000 / 120,000)
3. The VC ends up with 15% of the company. 0.25% less than the VC Friendly Approach

Ironically, the founders (existing shareholders) will end up with a smaller shareholding under the Founder Friendly Approach than the VC Friendly Approach, as more new shares will have been issued.

== See also ==
- Capitalization table
- Corporate venture capital
- Liquidation preference
- Market research
- Market segmentation
- Pricing
- Private equity
- Revenue-based financing
- Securities offerings
- Securities Act of 1933
- Series A round
- SWORD-financing
- Venture capital
