= Controlling interest =

Majority of a corporation's voting shares

A controlling interest is an ownership interest in a corporation with enough voting shares to prevail in any stockholders' motion. A majority of voting shares (over 50%) is always a controlling interest. When a party holds less than the majority of the voting shares, other present circumstances can be considered to determine whether that party is still considered to hold a controlling ownership interest.

In the United States, Delaware corporations have a 2/3 vote requirement for a motion to pass. In theory, this would mean that a controlling interest would have to be over two-thirds of the voting shares.

A 2019 study published in the Virginia Law Review said dual-class stock structures, common to newly public technology companies, creates governance risks and costs, including the potential loss of economic value for non-voting shares held by public investors.

== See also ==
- Consolidation (business)
- Holding company
- Minority interest
- Parent company
- Subsidiary
