= Participating preferred stock =

Preferred shares with extra profit participation

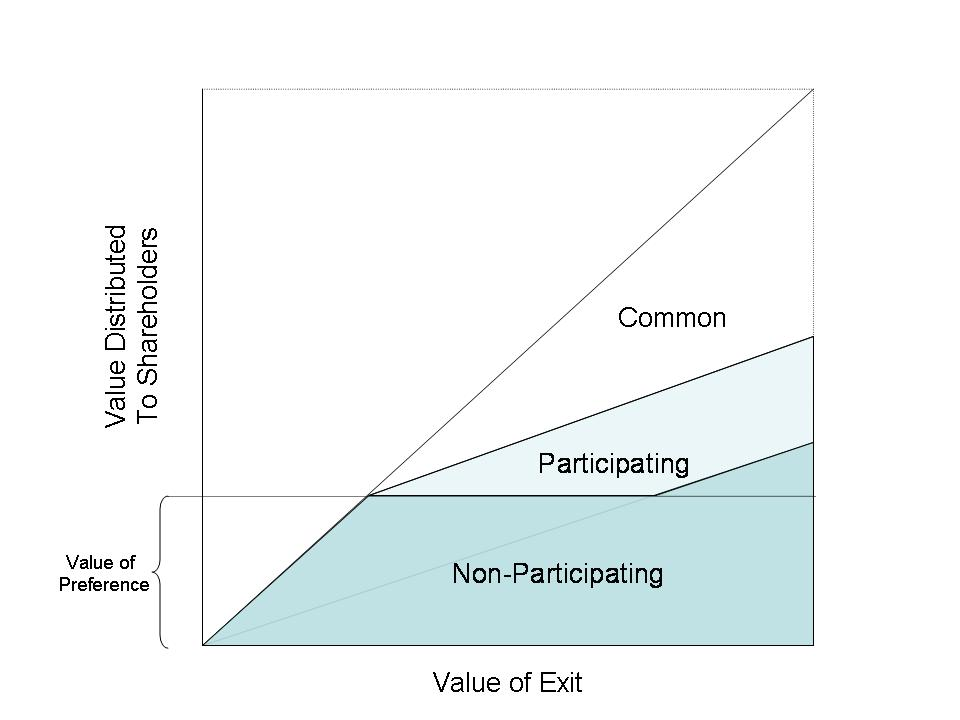
Participating Preferred vs. Non-Participating Preferred Illustration.

Participating preferred stock is preferred stock that provides a specific dividend that is paid before any dividends are paid to common stock holders, and that takes precedence over common stock in the event of a liquidation. This form of financing is typically used by private equity investors and venture capital (VC) firms.

Holders of participating preferred stock have the choice between two payoffs: a liquidation preference or an optional conversion. In a liquidation, they first get their money back at the original purchase price, the balance of any proceeds is then shared between common and participating preferred stock as though all convertible stock was converted. In an optional conversion, all shares are converted into common stock. Holders of participating preferred stock will always pick the option with the highest payoff.

In a liquidation, participating shares distribute the remaining assets with common stock pro rata. Pro rata means as a function of number of common shares on an as converted basis. The remaining proceeds are distributed based on ownership.

== Uses ==
Like common stock, preferred stocks represent partial ownership in a company. Preferred stock shareholders may or may not enjoy any of the voting rights of those holding common stock. Also, unlike common stock, a preferred stock pays a fixed dividend that does not fluctuate. Often the dividend is cumulative. Thus, the company must pay all unpaid preferred dividends accumulated during previous periods before it can pay dividends to common shareholders. If the company is unable to pay this dividend, the preferred shareholders may have the right to force a liquidation of the company. If the dividend is not cumulative, preferred shares are not paid a dividend until the board of directors approves of a dividend.

Participation in liquidations in venture capital fundraising has slowly come out of trend. In the second quarter of 2017, financings that provided participation made up only 13% down from 25% in Q3 2015. When participating, entrepreneurs have the option to set a cap on participation. This means after liquidation, holders of participating preferred shares can have a payout up to a certain multiplier of their initial purchase price. In Q2 2017, 69% of financings had no cap on participation.

Participating preferred is often used as a "bridge" between a company that desires a higher valuation and a VC that believes in a lower valuation. A VC will agree to a higher valuation if it is accompanied by a participating preferred security—essentially challenging the company to earn the upside of the higher valuation. Participating shares give a VC the best potential upside as they can freely choose between liquidation or an optional conversion.

The main benefit of owning preferred stock is that the investor has a greater claim on the company's assets than common stockholders. Preferred shareholders always receive their dividends first and, in the event the company goes bankrupt, preferred shareholders are paid off before the holders of common stock. In general, there are five different types of preferred stock: cumulative preferred, non-cumulative, participating, convertible, and callable.

== See also ==
- Capital structure
- Share class
- Common stock dividend
- Preferred stock
- Warrant (finance)
