= Extendible bond =

Financial instrument

Extendible bond (or extendable bond) is a complex bond with the embedded option for a holder to extend its maturity date by a number of years. Such a bond may be considered as a portfolio of a straight, shorter-term bond and a call option to buy a longer-term bond. This relatively rare type of bond works to the advantage of investors during periods of declining interest rates. Pricing of the extendible bond will be similar to that of a puttable bond.

Sometimes, the bond may be structured so as to give an option to extend to the issuer. In this case, pricing will be similar to that of a callable bond.

== Pricing ==
Price of extendible bond = Price of straight bond + Price of the option to extend

- Price of an extendible bond is always higher than the price of a straight bond because the embedded option adds value to an investor;
- Yield on an extendible bond is lower than the yield on a straight bond.
