= Embedded option =

Contract feature giving the holder option-like rights within a host financial instrument

An embedded option is a component of a financial bond or other security, which provides the bondholder or the issuer the right to take some action against the other party. There are several types of options that can be embedded into a bond; common types of bonds with embedded options include callable bond, puttable bond, convertible bond, extendible bond, exchangeable bond, and capped floating rate note. A bond may have several options embedded if they are not mutually exclusive.

Securities other than bonds that may have embedded options include senior equity, convertible preferred stock and exchangeable preferred stock. See Convertible security.

The valuation of these securities couples bond- or equity-valuation, as appropriate, with option pricing. For bonds here, there are two main approaches, as follows. Other securities with embedded derivatives are priced similarly.

1. Depending on the type of option, the option price, as calculated using the Black–Scholes (or other) model, is either added to or subtracted from the price of the "straight" bond (i.e. as if it had no optionality) and this total is then the value of the bond.
2. A bespoke "tree" (usually a lattice-based short-rate model) may be constructed where the option's effect is incorporated at each node in the tree, impacting either the bond price or the option price as specified; see further under bond option.

Once the price has been calculated, the various yields can then be calculated for the security. Calculating rate-sensitivities on these instruments is complicated: the embedded features make measures such as duration and convexity (and DV01) less meaningful; and analysts instead use effective duration and effective convexity.
