= Death spiral financing =

Type of company collapse

Death spiral financing is the result of a structured convertible financing used to fund primarily small cap companies in the marketplace, causing the company's stock to fall dramatically, which can lead to the company's ultimate downfall.

Some small companies rely on selling convertible debt to large private investors (see private investment in public equity) to fund their operations and growth. This convertible debt, often convertible preferred stock or convertible debentures, can be converted to the common stock of the issuing company at a discount to the market value of the common stock at the time of each conversion.

Under a “death spiral” scenario, the holder of the convertible debt might short the issuer's common stock, at which time the debt holder converts some of the convertible debt to common shares with which he then covers the debt holder's short position. The debt holder continues to sell short and cover with converted stock, which, along with selling by other shareholders alarmed by the falling price, continually weakens the share price, making the shares unattractive to new investors and possibly severely limiting the company's ability to obtain new financing if necessary.

The lender would have a potentially greater gain if the shares were to increase in value, but if they decrease in value, there is some protection. Otherwise, they would probably not be willing to lend the money because of the poor risk profiles of the companies interested in this type of financing.

There are some ways to limit the "spiral" situation, e.g. by prohibiting short selling so as to have a stronger incentive for the debt holder to see the stock price increase. It is also worth noting that in a spiral scenario, it becomes more and more difficult for the debt holder to recover its investment because of the increasing volume of common stock it receives upon each conversion of its debt. Another mean to limit the "spiral" risk is to ensure that the amount of funding is in line with the trading activity of the common stock, so as to reduce the potential decrease resulting from the sale of common stock by the debt holder.

Companies willing to agree to financing on these terms often could not obtain funding through any other means due to their early development stage or credit risk profile. The terms, though viewed by some as onerous, give the lender a potential way to recover their debt regardless of what happens to the shares of the company, and the company easy access to dilutive but relatively cheap funding in terms of cash cost.

== See also ==
- Convertible security
- Convertible bond
