= Term sheet =

Type of legal document

A term sheet is a bullet-point document outlining the material terms and conditions of a potential business agreement, establishing the basis for future negotiations between a seller and buyer. It is usually the first documented evidence of a possible acquisition. It may be either binding or non-binding.

After a term sheet has been "executed", it guides legal counsel in the preparation of a proposed "definitive agreement". It then guides, but is not necessarily binding, as the signatories negotiate, usually with legal counsel, the final terms of their agreement.

Term sheets are very similar to "letters of intent" (LOI) in that they are both preliminary, mostly non-binding documents meant to record the intentions of two or more parties to enter into a future agreement based on specified (but incomplete or preliminary) terms. The difference between the two is slight and mostly a matter of style: an LOI is typically written in letter form and focuses on the intentions of the parties; a term sheet skips most of the formalities and lists deal terms in bullet-point or similar format. There is an implication that an LOI only refers to the final form. A term sheet may be a proposal, not an agreed-to document.

== Contractual impact ==
A term sheet may be either binding or non-binding. It may sometimes be interpreted by a court of law as binding the parties to it if it too-closely resembles a formal contract and does not contain a clear disclaimer. In SIGA Technologies v. PharmAthene, Inc., the Delaware Supreme Court held that, where a party to a detailed term sheet breaches its duty to negotiate in good faith, the other party may be entitled to an award of damages for the loss of the so-called "benefit of the bargain" being negotiated.

== Venture capital financing ==
Within the context of venture capital financing, a term sheet typically includes conditions for financing a startup company. The key offering terms in such a term sheet include (a) amount raised, (b) price per share, (c) pre-money valuation, (d) liquidation preference, (e) voting rights, (f) anti-dilution provisions, and (g) registration rights.

It is customary to begin the negotiation of a venture investment with the circulation of a term sheet, which is a summary of the terms the proposer (the issuer, the investor, or an intermediary) is prepared to accept. The term sheet is analogous to a letter of intent, a nonbinding outline of the principal points which the stock purchase agreement and related agreements will cover in detail.

The advantage of the abbreviated term sheet format is, first, that it expedites the process. Experienced counsel immediately know generally what is meant when the term sheet specifies "one demand registration at the issuer's expense, unlimited piggybacks at the issuer's expense, weighted average antidilution"; it saves time not to have to spell out the long-form edition of those references. Second, since the term sheet does not propose to be an agreement of any sort, it is less likely that a court will find unexpected promissory content; a "letter of intent" can be a dangerous document unless it specifies very clearly, as it should, which portions are meant to be binding and which merely guide the discussion and drafting. Some portions of a term sheet can have binding effect, of course, if and to the extent an interlocutory memorialization is needed of some binding promises, that is, confidentiality of the disclosures made in the negotiation. The summary format of a term sheet, however, makes it less likely that any party will be misled into thinking that some form of enforceable agreement has been memorialized when it has not.

Some important terms to founders and venture capitalists:

- Return - Valuation/Dilution: One of the most important terms for founders is valuation; whether the evaluation is high or not tells the entrepreneurs whether or not the investor is credible. Also, option pools are part of the evaluation and usually founders have the power to negotiate option pool. This term is important since option pool can lower the effective valuation.
- Control: a common arrangement is a board of three directors, one from the investor and two from the founders (for motivational purposes).
- Liquidation Preferences: This represents how much the founders will receive in an event of company sale etc. Thus it is very important as the ultimate goal is to make returns.
- Founder Vesting: This plays a major role in motivating the founders
- Voting Rights: Voting rights are important to venture capital investors in relation to prospective actions taken by the founders, including the sale of the company, additional financing, election of board members and other matters that should be approved by a certain threshold of the Series A Preferred stockholders (the venture capital investor).
- Co-Sale Terms: If one of the common shareholders were to sell their shares, partially or completely, they should include the investors, or drag them along with the sale and sell part of theirs. This is very crucial to the investor.
