= Capitalization table =

Analysis of company ownership structure

A capitalization table or cap table is a table providing an analysis of a company's percentages of ownership, equity dilution, and value of equity in each round of investment by founders, investors, and other owners.

== Overview ==
In its simplest form, a capitalization table, or "cap table" as it is often abbreviated, is a ledger that tracks the equity ownership of a company's shareholders: that is, how its capitalization is composed. However, the term can refer to the way in which any company keeps track of all of the relevant information related to all of its stakeholders (including debt, convertible debt, option, warrant, and derivatives holders) and their claims on the company. Public companies primarily use transfer agents and a wide array of technologies and systems to keep track of their stakeholder information and therefore it is uncommon for public companies to refer to their stakeholder records and accounting as a "cap table". Private companies typically have a much simpler capital structure and more limited stakeholder accounting requirements. In the earliest stages of their development, private companies may track their shareholders in a simple document or spreadsheet. Cap tables are widely used by entrepreneurs, venture capitalists, and investment bankers to model and to analyze events such as ownership dilution, issuing employee stock options, or issuing new securities. After several rounds of financing, a cap table can become highly complex.

Most cap tables are managed in spreadsheets, which may lack scalability—often, they are time-consuming to maintain and update and prone to human error. In recent years, cap table automation software has become popular with growing businesses with increasingly complex equity structures.

== Relationship to company shares ==
In the past, companies would issue shares on paper stock certificates and then use the cap table as an accounting representation and summary of share ownership. Public companies have increasingly eliminated all paper stock certificates in a process called "dematerialization" to simplify and decrease transactions costs. Most global regulators have made and encouraged financial system changes to encourage dematerialization.

In the US and many other countries, companies can use their cap table as the only system of record for recording stock ownership. US state laws support a concept of uncertificated, or book entry shares where the cap table is the formal legal record of equity ownership.

== Waterfall analysis ==
As a cap table becomes more complex, the ownership percentages indicated on the cap table can diverge from actual percentage of proceeds distributed to shareholders upon a liquidity event. Some industry commentators have called the difference between actual ownership percentage on the cap table and a shareholder's percentage of exit proceeds "accounting ownership" (actual ownership percentage on the cap table) vs. "economic ownership" (percentage of proceeds available to equity).

This situation leads to the concept of a "waterfall" or "waterfall analysis." A waterfall analysis details the exact payouts to every shareholder on a company's cap table based on a specific amount of proceeds available to equity in a particular liquidity scenario. Since a company often does not know if, when, or how it will achieve a liquidity event, waterfall analysis typically covers a range of liquidity assumptions. Liquidation preference charts extend the analysis, showing the economic outcome available to investors at all valuations across a range of outcomes, rather than focusing on a specific point or a discrete set of points.
