= A share =

A share may refer to:

- Class A share, a class of company share
- A-share (mainland China), all ordinary share that denominated in renminbi and traded on the stock exchanges of mainland China
