= Exchangeable =

Exchangeable may refer to:

- Exchangeable batteries, used with battery swapping in charging stations
- Exchangeable bond, a type of hybrid security
- Exchangeable image file format (Exif), a specification for the image file format used by digital cameras
- Exchangeable random variables, in statistics, a set of random variables whose joint distribution is the same irrespective of the order of the variables
