= Redemption value =

Redemption value is the price at which the issuing company may choose to repurchase a security before its maturity date. A bond is purchased "at a discount" if its redemption value exceeds its purchase price. It is purchased "at a premium" if its purchase price exceeds its redemption value. Thus, the right will only be exercised at a discount. See: Callable bond; Embedded option; Convertible bond.
