= Post-money valuation =

Method of valuing a company

Post-money valuation is a way of expressing the value of a company after an investment has been made. This value is equal to the sum of the pre-money valuation and the amount of new equity.

These valuations are used to express how much ownership external investors, such as venture capitalists and angel investors, receive when they make a cash injection into a company. The amount external investors invest into a company is equal to the company's post-money valuation multiplied by the fraction of the company those investors own after the investment. Equivalently, the implied post-money valuation is calculated as the dollar amount of investment divided by the equity stake gained in an investment.

More specifically, the post-money valuation of a financial investment deal is given by the formula $PMV = N \times P$, where PMV is the post-money valuation, N is the number of shares the company has after the investment, and P is the price per share at which the investment was made. This formula is similar to the market capitalization formula used to express the value of public companies.

== Example 1 ==
If a company is worth $100 million (pre-money) and an investor makes an investment of $25 million, the new, post-money valuation of the company will be $125 million. The investor will now own 20% of the company.

This basic example illustrates the general concept. However, in actual, real-life scenarios, the calculation of post-money valuation can be more complicated—because the capital structure of companies often includes convertible loans, warrants, and option-based management incentive schemes.

Strictly speaking, the calculation is the price paid per share multiplied by the total number of shares existing after the investment—i.e., it takes into account the number of shares arising from the conversion of loans, exercise of in-the-money warrants, and any in-the-money options. Thus it is important to confirm that the number is a fully diluted and fully converted post-money valuation.

In this scenario, the pre-money valuation should be calculated as the post-money valuation minus the total money coming into the company—not only from the purchase of shares, but also from the conversion of loans, the nominal interest, and the money paid to exercise in-the-money options and warrants.

== Example 2 ==
Consider a company with 1,000,000 shares, a convertible loan note for $1,000,000 converting at 75% of the next round price, warrants for 200,000 shares at $10 a share, and a granted employee stock ownership plan of 200,000 shares at $4 per share. The company receives an offer to invest $8,000,000 at $8 per share.

The post-money valuation is equal to $8 times the number of shares existing after the transaction—in this case, 2,366,667 shares. This figure includes the original 1,000,000 shares, plus 1,000,000 shares from new investment, plus 166,667 shares from the loan conversion ($1,000,000 divided by 75% of the next investment round price of $8, or $1,000,000 / (.75 * 8) ), plus 200,000 shares from in-the-money options. The fully converted, fully diluted post-money valuation in this example is $18,933,336.

The pre-money valuation would be $9,133,336—calculated by taking the post-money valuation of $18,933,336 and subtracting the $8,000,000 of new investment, as well as $1,000,000 for the loan conversion and $800,000 from the exercise of the rights under the ESOP. Note that the warrants cannot be exercised because they are not in-the-money (i.e. their price, $10 a share, is still higher than the new investment price of $8 a share).

== Versus market value ==
Importantly, a company's post-money valuation is not equal to its market value. The post-money valuation formula does not take into account the special features of preferred stock. It assumes that preferred stock has the same value as common stock, which is usually not true as preferred stock often has liquidation preference, participation, and other features that make it worth more than common stock. Because preferred stock is worth more than common stock, post-money valuations tend to overstate the value of companies. Will Gornall and Ilya Strebulaev provide the fair values of the 135 of the largest U.S. venture capital-backed companies and argue that these companies' post-money valuations are an average of 50% above their market values.

== Up round, down round, and flat round ==
Equity rounds can be classified into three distinct types to determine whether a round has been a success for the stakeholders of a company. These distinct types are an up round, down round, and flat round. However, there is not an industry consensus on the precise definition of these terms and this is an area of continued debate among industry participants, including investors, companies, and attorneys. The debate centers on whether company valuation or price per share should be used to classify the round. If company valuation is used, then the pre-money valuation of the current round would be compared to the post-money valuation of the prior round.

According to The Wall Street Journal, share price should be used to classify the round. Consistent with that assessment, in a survey of attorneys based in Silicon Valley, eight out of ten said that share price should be used to classify the round. That said, two other lawyers in the same survey claimed that valuation and share price should both be used together to classify the round. In contrast, some investors and companies have argued that valuation alone, and not share price, should be used to classify the round. For example, an up round would occur when the pre-money valuation of the current round is more than the prior round's post-money valuation.

Companies that are successfully growing will often raise equity in a series of subsequent up rounds from institutional investors. For example, institutional investors including venture capital firms, growth equity firms, private equity firms, corporate investors, and hedge funds may participate in these up rounds. These institutional investors may also participate in down rounds and flat rounds. Ultimately, these successfully growing companies may attain a successful exit, such as an IPO, direct listing, merger, or acquisition.

== See also ==
- Pre-money valuation
