= Simple agreement for future equity =

Financing vehicle for startup businesses

A simple agreement for future equity (SAFE or occasionally Safe, sometimes incorrectly referred to as a "SAFE note") is an agreement between an investor and a company that provides rights to the investor for future equity in the company similar to a warrant, except without determining a specific price per share at the time of the initial investment. The SAFE investor receives the future shares when a priced round of investment or liquidity event occurs. SAFEs are intended to provide a simpler mechanism for startups to seek initial funding other than convertible notes.

== Mechanics ==
The precise conditions of a SAFE vary. However, the basic mechanics are that the investor provides a certain amount of funding to the company at signing. In return, the investor receives stock in the company at a later date, in connection with specific, contractually agreed on liquidity events. The primary trigger is generally the sale of preferred shares by the company, typically as part of a future priced fund-raising round. Unlike a straight purchase of equity, shares are not valued at the time the SAFE is signed. Instead, investors and the company negotiate the mechanism by which future shares will be issued, and defer actual valuation. These conditions generally involve a valuation cap for the company and/or a discount to the share valuation at the moment of the trigger event. In this way, the SAFE investor shares in the upside of the company between the time the SAFE is signed (and funding provided) and the trigger event.

Unlike a convertible note, a SAFE is not a loan; it is more like a warrant. In particular, there is no interest paid and no maturity date, and therefore SAFEs are not subject to the regulations that debt may be in many jurisdictions. This simplicity is the primary motivation of a SAFE. "Safes should work just like convertible notes, but with fewer complications", according to startup accelerator Y Combinator.

== History and criticism ==
Y Combinator introduced the Simple Agreement for Future Equity ("SAFE") as an alternative to the convertible note in late 2013. It was originally drafted by Y Combinator lawyer Carolynn Levy. This investment vehicle has since become popular in the U.S., Canada, and Israel, due to its simplicity and low transaction costs.

However, as use has become more prevalent, concerns have emerged related to unexpected dilution (and voting control) issues for entrepreneurs, especially where multiple SAFE investment rounds are done prior to a priced equity round. In 2018, Y Combinator replaced the original pre-money SAFE with a post-money version, in which the investor's ownership percentage is set when the SAFE is signed rather than calculated at the time of conversion. Under this structure, the dilution from issuing several SAFEs falls on the founders rather than being shared among the SAFE holders. SAFEs are also dangerous for non-accredited crowdfunding investors who might be directed towards SAFEs in small businesses that realistically will never obtain priced equity financing, and therefore never trigger a conversion into equity.

Institutional investors are likewise at risk in scenarios where SAFEs do not come attached to standard control terms such as pro rata or liquidation preferences. Additionally, the tax treatment of SAFEs is disadvantageous, as the holding period (relevant to Qualified Small Business Stock tax exemption) begins upon stock issuance rather than signature of the SAFE. This can cause investors to miss the cutoff date that would qualify an investment for significant tax avoidance.
