= Trust-preferred security =

A trust-preferred security is a security possessing characteristics of both equity and debt. A company creates trust-preferred securities by creating a trust, issuing debt to it, and then having it issue preferred stock to investors. Trust-preferred securities are generally issued by bank holding companies. The preferred stock securities issued by the trust are what are referred to as trust-preferred securities.

The security is a hybrid security with characteristics of both subordinated debt and preferred stock in that it is generally very long term (30 years or more), allows early redemption by the issuer, makes periodic fixed or variable interest payments, and matures at face value. In addition, trust preferred securities issued by bank holding companies will usually allow the deferral of interest payments for up to 5 years.

The principal advantages of these hybrid characteristics are favorable tax, accounting, and credit treatment. Trust preferred securities have an additional advantage over other types of hybrid securities (such as similar types of debt issued directly to investors without the intervening trust), which is that if they are issued by a bank holding company, they will be treated as capital (equity/own funds) rather than as debt for regulatory purposes. This is why trust preferred securities are issued overwhelmingly by bank holding companies, even though any company can issue them. However, the Dodd-Frank Act changes this benefit.

== Structure ==
The issuing company forms a Delaware trust (a Connecticut trust is also common) and holds 100% of the common stock of the trust. The trust then issues preferred stock to investors. All of the proceeds from the issuance of preferred stock are paid to the company. In exchange, the company issues junior subordinated debt to the trust with essentially the same terms as the trust's preferred stock. All steps except the formation of the trust occur simultaneously. If the issuing company is a bank holding company, it will also usually guarantee the interest and maturity payments on the trust preferred stock.

== Advantages ==
Trust preferred securities are used by bank holding companies for their favorable tax, accounting, and regulatory capital treatments. Specifically, the subordinated debt securities are taxed like debt obligations by the IRS, so interest payments are deductible. Dividends on preferred stock, by comparison, are paid out of after-tax income. The company may therefore enjoy a significantly lower cost of funding.

If issued by a bank holding company, they are treated as capital rather than liabilities under banking regulations, and may be treated as the highest quality capital (tier 1 capital) if they have certain characteristics. Since the amount of liabilities (such as deposits) that a banking institution may have is limited to some multiple of its capital, this regulatory treatment is highly favorable and is why the trust preferred structure is favored by bank holding companies.

To be eligible as Tier 1 capital, such instruments must provide for a minimum five-year consecutive deferral period on distributions to preferred shareholders. In addition, the intercompany loan must be subordinated to all subordinated debt and have the longest feasible maturity. The amount of these instruments, together with other cumulative preferred stock a bank holding company may include in Tier 1 capital, may constitute up to 25 percent of the sum of all core capital elements, including cumulative perpetual preferred stock and trust preferred stock. Non-financial companies are more likely to use less complex structures, such as issuing junior subordinated debt directly to the public.

== Disadvantages ==
The principal disadvantages of trust preferred securities is cost. Because the trust preferred securities are subordinated to all of the issuer's other debt and typically have features like early redemption and optional deferral of interest payments, investors demand high interest rates. These rates will be much higher than ordinary senior debt or subordinated debt. Offering costs are high as well. Investment banks will take a large underwriting fee to sell the securities to the public, and legal and accounting fees will also be high. They have also been blamed for the failure of a few banks during the recent financial crisis.

== Colin's amendment ==
The Dodd-Frank Wall Street Reform and Consumer Protection Act included a provision which would "exclude trust-preferred securities from the regulatory capital of bank holding companies", although it has several exceptions intended to allow these holding companies to transition into compliance with the law, including an exception for bank holding companies with less than $15 billion in consolidated assets as of December 31, 2009 and an exception for small bank holding companies under the Board of Governors’ Small Bank Holding Company Policy Statement.

== See also ==
- Debenture
