= Butternut Box =

Dog food subscription service in Europe

- Type: Private limited company
- Industry: Pet food
- Founder: David Nolan; Kevin Glynn
- Headquarters: London, United Kingdom
- Website: butternutbox.com

Butternut Box is a dog food subscription service founded in 2016. It is based in west London and currently operates across the UK and several European countries.

== History ==
David Nolan and Kevin Glynn founded the company in 2016 after Nolan's rescue dog developed persistent health issues, including itchy skin, hair loss, and digestive problems. Seeking a solution, they began preparing home-cooked meals for their dog.

Nolan and Glynn started to make and deliver custom dog meals to other dog owners. They began working on the business at weekends whilst working at their jobs at Goldman Sachs during the week. They then left their jobs at Goldman Sachs to start the business.

By 2017, the company had sold 250,000 meals and raised one million pounds in a seed funding round led by Passion Capital. Literacy Capital took an initial stake in the company in 2018 as part of a £5 million funding round. The company raised a further £100m in funding from Claret Capital, Passion Capital, Whitestar Capital and HSBC. In 2021, it raised £40m from backers, which it used to support growth. In 2023, the company raised £275 million in a funding round led by General Atlantic, leading to a £500m pre-money valuation. In 2023, Harris Williams advised the company to raise a further £100m in capital by selling a stake in their business. The firm also received backing from Bernard Arnault's L Catterton.

In 2017, it moved its headquarters to premises in west London.

The company attained B Corporation certification status in 2022 and established a new manufacturing facility. The company also unveiled an edible billboard in south London.

The company acquired the Polish brand PsiBufet in 2023. The company funded a second manufacturing facility in Poland with €75 million in debt financing.

In 2024, the company began feeding cats with its fresh cat food brand, Marro.

== Products ==
The company delivers fresh dog food tailored to their customers' dogs' dietary requirements. Its website gives dogs an online meal portal with the optimum food measurements. Each pet has a comprehensive profile section that logs their weight, sex, eating habits, activity levels and quirks. The company algorithms calculates its plans based on each dog's requirements, such as age, weight, activity levels and health conditions.

The food is taste-tested by humans to ensure quality and flavour.

Fresh dog food is made using a combination of protein, carbohydrates, fats, vitamins, minerals and fibre. It is designed to be kept in the fridge or freezer.
