= Venture debt =

Debt finance

Venture debt or venture lending (related: "venture leasing") is a type of debt financing provided to venture-backed companies by specialized banks or non-bank lenders to fund working capital or capital expenses, such as purchasing equipment. Venture debt can complement venture capital and provide value to fast growing companies and their investors. Unlike traditional bank lending, venture debt is available to startups and growth companies that do not have positive cash flows or significant assets to give as collateral. Venture debt providers combine their loans with warrants, or rights to purchase equity, to compensate for the higher risk of default, although this is not always the case.

Venture debt can be a source of capital for entrepreneurial companies. As a complement to equity financing, venture debt provides growth capital to extend the cash runway of a startup company to achieve the next milestone while minimizing equity dilution for both employees and investors.

== Types of venture debt ==
Venture debt is typically structured as one of three types:

- Growth capital: Typically term loans, used to extend runway between equity rounds, for M&A activity, milestone financing or working capital.
- Accounts receivable financing: borrowings against the accounts receivable item on the balance sheet.
- Equipment financing: loans for the purchase of equipment such as network infrastructure.

Venture lenders frequently piggyback on the due diligence done by the venture capital firm. For loans provided to loss-making companies, lenders often rely on the next round of venture capital financing or venture debt refinancing for their repayments.

Venture debt providers are typically classified into two categories:

1. Commercial banks with venture-lending arms

These banks typically accept deposits from the startup companies, and offer venture debt to complement their overall service offerings. Venture debt is usually not bread and butter for these providers. Debt lines from the banks start as low as $100,000 and for appropriately backed and/or companies with scale, can reach into the tens of millions in terms of facility sizes. Some players in this category are:

- City National Bank
- Comerica (NYSE:CMA)
- East West Bank (NASDAQ:EWBC)
- HomeStreet Bank (NASDAQ:HMST)
- Wells Fargo (NYSE:WFC)

2. Specialty finance firms ("venture debt funds")

Many independent non-banking lenders have emerged over the years in USA, Europe and Asia. These funds are focused solely on providing venture debt and also have the ability to provide higher dollar size and more flexible loan terms. Some of these are:

North America

- TriplePoint Capital (NASDAQ: TPVG)
- Hercules Capital (NYSE: HTGC)
- Trinity Capital (NASDAQ: TRIN)
- Horizon Technology Finance Corp (NASDAQ: HRZN)
- Runway Growth Capital

Europe

- Kreos Capital
- European Investment Bank

Southeast Asia

- Innoven Capital

=== Industry Dynamics ===
As a rule of thumb, the size of venture debt investment in a company is roughly 1/3 to 1/2 of venture capital (equity). The VC industry invested around $27B in the last 12 months. This would imply around $9B potential debt market. However, not all VC-backed companies receive venture debt, and a study has recently estimated that lenders provide one venture debt dollar for every seven venture capital dollar invested. This implies around $3.9B debt market. There are several philosophies behind the various players. As a rule, they all prefer better branded VCs backing any potential portfolio company - some are more militant about this than others. They universally will provide capital to companies still in a money loss mode, with variances around comfort on timelines to breakeven, next round of capital, recently raised equity, etc.

Since most startups tap into venture debt to augment equity, the size of the venture debt industry follows the movement of the VC industry.

== Financing terms ==
Venture debt lenders expect returns of 12–25% on their capital which is achieved through a combination of loan interest and capital appreciation of warrants . The warrants help compensate for the higher rate of perceived level of risk on these loans taken by the lender and therefore, these warrants provide incremental returns from equity ownership in the target companies that are successful and achieve a trade sale or IPO.

Equipment financing can be provided to fund 100% of the cost of the capital expenditure. Receivables financing is typically capped at 80–85% of the accounts receivable balance.

Loan terms vary widely, but differ from traditional bank loans in a number of ways:

- Repayment: ranging from 12 months to 48 months. Can be interest-only for a period, followed by interest plus principal, or a balloon payment (with rolled-up interest) at the end of the term.
- Interest rate: varies based on the yield curve prevalent in the market where the debt is being offered. In the US and Europe, interest for equipment financing can be as low as prime rate (US) or SOFR (US/UK, replacing the discontinued LIBOR in June 2023) or EURIBOR (Europe) plus 1% to 2%. For accounts receivable and growth capital financing, prime plus 3%. In India, where interest rates are higher, financing may be offered between 14% and 20%.
- Collateral: venture debt providers usually require a first lien on assets of the borrower like IP or the company itself, except for equipment loans where the capital assets acquired may be used as collateral.
- Warrant coverage: the lender will request warrants over equity in the range of 5% to 20% of the value of the loan. A percentage of the loan's face value can be converted into equity at the per-share price of the last (or concurrent) venture financing round. The warrants are usually exercised when the company is acquired or goes public, yielding an 'equity kicker' return to the lender.
- Rights to invest: On occasion, the lender may also seek to obtain some rights to invest in the borrower's subsequent equity round on the same terms, conditions and pricing offered to its investors in those rounds.
- Covenants: borrowers face fewer operational restrictions or covenants with venture debt. Accounts receivable loans will typically include some minimum profitability or cash flow covenants.

== Use-cases of venture debt ==
There are three primary scenarios where venture debt is considered by companies:

- Extend cash runway to next valuation: Venture debt can be used to extend the cash runway of a startup company to the next valuation driver. A company could raise a smaller equity round and then leverage venture debt to ensure the next equity round is raised at a higher valuation. Management and employees would benefit from less dilution due to smaller equity raises while existing investors would also benefit from less equity dilution and less cash required to maintain their ownership position.
- Extend cash runway to profitability: Venture debt can extend the runway of a company to be "cash flow positive". The company can leverage venture debt to eliminate a last round of equity financing. This use of debt reduces equity dilution for both employees and current investors, and propels the company forward during a critical period of growth.
- Avoid a down round: Venture debt can serve as a cushion for when a company does not perform to plan and does not have enough cash to last between equity rounds. In the case where a company's performance is not up to its plan, it will likely result in raising equity at a down round. Venture debt could have helped bridge the gap until the company is back on track.

== See also ==
- Hybrid security
- Shareholder loan
- Seniority (finance)
