= Super-voting stock =

Confers disproportionately large voting rights in a company

Supervoting stock is a share class whose holders have disproportionately larger voting right than holders of other kinds of stock. It enables a limited number of stockholders to control a company.

Usually, the purpose of the super voting shares is to give key company insiders greater control over the company's voting rights, and thus its board and corporate actions. The existence of super-voting shares can also be an effective defense against hostile takeovers, since key insiders can maintain majority voting control of their company without actually owning more than half of the outstanding shares.

An example of a company that uses super-voting stock is Alphabet, the parent company of Google. It has three classes of shares: Class A, Class B, and Class C. Its Class B shares are super-voting shares, which confer 10 votes per share. They are only held by founders and insiders, and cannot be publicly traded.

== See also ==
- Preferred stock
- Share class
