= Shareholder loan =

Debt-like form of financing

Shareholder loan is a debt-like form of financing provided by shareholders. Usually, it is the most junior debt in the company's debt portfolio. On the other hand, if this loan belongs to shareholders it could be treated as equity. Maturity of shareholder loans is long with low or deferred interest payments. Sometimes, shareholder loan is confused with the inverse, a loan from a company that is extended to its shareholders.

== Applications ==
- This form of financing is quite common while funding young companies with positive cash flows because such firms are still not able to raise debt from banks but need debt anyway to create a tax shield.
- The contribution of shareholder loans to a corporation's capital structure generally relieves the corporation's debt load and is, therefore, used in leveraged buyouts to manage a degree of leverage.
- Shareholders can extend the loan in distressed or near-default situations to save the company.

== See also ==
- Hybrid security
- Seniority (financial)
- Venture debt
