= Split share corporation =

Corporation to reduce stock market risk

A split share corporation is a corporation that exists for a defined period of time to transform the risk and investment return (capital gains, dividends, and possibly also profits from the writing of covered options) of a basket of shares of conventional dividend-paying corporations into the risk and return of the two or more classes of publicly traded shares in the split share corporation.

== Purpose and mechanisms ==
Most commonly a split share corporation issues equal numbers of shares from a class of preferred shares and a class of capital or class A shares. The proceeds of the share offering are invested in conventional dividend-paying shares according to the regulations of the split share corporation. The preferred shares typically offer relatively high and secure dividend yield at a fixed coupon rate but with no expectation of capital gain by the time that the split share corporation is wound up. The capital shares often (but not in every corporation) pay a dividend like the preferred shares; in addition, the capital shares offer participation in the leveraged capital gains (or losses) of the underlying basket of conventional shares.

The total market value of the shares of the split share corporation is backed by the value of the underlying basket of shares. The value of the preferred shares is further reinforced by the priority given to those shares over the capital shares in the payment of dividend income and in the eventual return of the full initial price of the preferred shares.

The underlying basket of shares may include shares from only one conventional corporation (e.g. major banks or insurance companies); however, greater diversification, and usually lowered risk, is afforded if the basket contains shares from many corporations in the same sector (e.g. financial services) or across different sectors. The composition of the underlying basket of shares could be relatively fixed, that is, managed passively as in an exchange-traded fund; however, it is usually the case that the managers of the split share corporation have some flexibility to actively manage the relative proportions of the holdings within the basket in an attempt to increase the return.

The preferred and capital shares of the split corporation are issued in some fixed ratio. Often the preferred and capital shares are issued in precisely equal numbers. In such a case, each pair of preferred and capital shares is sometimes called a unit. However, the proportion of preferred and capital shares does not necessarily have to be one-to-one. Reducing the ratio of issued preferred shares to capital shares (e.g., one preferred share for every two capital shares) would reduce the risk and safely support higher yield for the preferred shares at the cost of making the capital shares less attractive to investors due to increased risk, lower sustainable yield payout and smaller capital gain leverage.

The dividend income from the underlying shares may be insufficient to pay out the dividend income for both the preferred and capital shares. In order to produce more income, split share corporations will sometimes employ covered call writing and cash-covered put writing.

== Canada ==
As of June 2022, there are 23 split share corporations on the Toronto Stock Exchange. Back in April 2013 there were 34 split share, and in March 2008 there were 63 split share corporations.

== Investment objectives ==
The preferred shares of a split share corporation are intended to provide an investment vehicle for more conservative investors, one that provides a relatively high income stream and safety in the original investment that is secured by the value of the underlying basket of shares. Greater safety is provided since the preferred shares are given priority over the capital shares both when income is paid out and when the corporation is wrapped up. The income from the preferred shares is usually declared as dividend income, which in some jurisdictions (e.g. Canada) has favorable tax rates compared to the tax rates that apply to the interest income that is produced by bonds or commercial paper. The preferred shares of a split share corporation can offer greater diversification than the preferred shares of a single conventional corporation.

With their fixed maturity date, fixed dividend rate and seniority over common stock, the preferred shares have many of the characteristics of a bond, and thus one might expect their value on the secondary market to vary inversely with the prevailing interest rates, just like a bond. Historically, however, the values of the preferred shares of financially sound split share corporations have tended to keep relatively close to their respective wind-up values. In practice credit risk appears to be a greater factor in the valuation of the relatively thinly traded preferred shares as opposed to the value of alternative (and more efficiently traded) conventional fixed-income instruments like bonds.

The capital shares of a split share corporation are intended to be a more aggressive investment vehicle, one that can provide both high income and the promise of amplified capital gains compared to the capital gains of the underlying basket of shares. In effect, the holders of capital shares are borrowing money from the holders of the preferred shares at the dividend rate of the preferred shares, and investing that money in a greater number of shares in the underlying basket of shares. Capital gains (or losses) are amplified in the capital shares because the value of the preferred shares is held relatively constant, and the resulting increased volatility of the equity in the underlying basket of shares is borne mostly by the capital shares. Holders of the capital shares take on their obligation to guarantee dividend payments to the holders of the preferred shares in exchange for amplified returns. In addition, the income from the capital shares can be structured to be treatable, for tax purposes, as mostly or even entirely capital gain. In many jurisdictions, such as Canada, capital gains are taxed at a lower rate than either dividend income or interest income.

== Volatility and risk considerations ==
The capital shares bear greater risk than the preferred shares in the event that the value of the underlying basket of conventional shares falls in value. Dividend payments to the holders of capital shares may be reduced or even suspended entirely before reductions can be considered in the dividends paid to the holders of the preferred shares. The value of the capital shares on the secondary markets may fluctuate considerably and may be reduced to zero. Over the longer term, the risk to the holders of capital shares should be moderated by the usually high quality of the underlying dividend-paying shares, typically blue-chip, in the basket.

The preferred and capital shares of a split share corporation are independently tradeable securities, and hence their value is subject to market forces. If the volume of traded shares is relatively small, then the price of split share corporations can be volatile as with any other thinly traded security. Close to the expiration date, however, the value of the preferred shares will tend to converge on the initial issue price if the split share corporation is judged by the market to have sufficient equity to fully pay back the preferred shareholders.

Some split share corporations provide an exchange mechanism, in which units of the split share corporation can be converted into shares of the underlying basket of shares, and vice versa. This mechanism would allow arbitrage trading to keep the aggregate value of the units close to the value of the underlying basket of shares, hence reducing the tracking error between the market value of the underlying shares and the risk-adjusted present value of the preferred and capital shares.
