= SWORD-financing =

SWORD-financing (stock and warrant off-balance sheet research & development financing) is a special form of financing invented to help junior biotech companies access institutional capital markets to finance their research and development (R&D) via establishing a special purpose entity and giving the investors partial rights to the outcomes of the R&D projects that they are funding.

== Overview ==
Innovation is vital to biotech firms. However, uncertainty of the commercial viability and regulatory approval of new products and technologies makes innovation a very risky undertaking. Conventional internal financing of innovation is generally not possible because biotech firms tend to be small with meager profits and few cash resources. SWORD financing can be used instead to encourage innovation by diversifying risk across wide financial markets. With SWORD, investors, who are usually institutional investors or wealthy individuals looking to capitalize on the latest technology, are given an opportunity to identify and finance underfunded, yet attractive projects. An SPE acts as an intermediary between the parent company and the investors, separating the project from the existing liabilities of the parent company. To provide flexibility and liquidity for all the parties, an SPE issues special securities (units) and raises finance via public or private offerings. In essence, one unit is a portfolio consisting of one share of SPE’s equity, one warrant to purchase a share of the parent firms' common stock, and a call option for the parent firm to buy back shares of SPE.

== Comparison to other financing methods for biotech companies ==
As above, SWORD is generally preferred over the other financing methods because it provides flexibility in making investment and financing decisions that can enable a biotech firm to engage in R&D that otherwise might not be undertaken.

=== Equity financing ===
Equity financing is expensive for the biotech industry especially if the use of funds is for R&D. Investors will be sceptical of the returns of their investments as the outcome of R&D is not always guaranteed to say the least. In order to raise funds with equity financing, therefore, biotech firms may have to give away a large portion.

=== Debt financing ===
Since product development and regulatory approval in the biotech industry takes considerable time, an R&D venture financed by debt might default on interest payments before the R&D proves successful. Debt also adds significant risk to the business entity. Debt financing might not even be possible in this case as the assets (or collateral) with these types of projects is very small.

=== Venture capital ===
Venture capitalists might demand a high stake in the company. The company will want to prevent this due to loss of ownership. Further, VC's may place restrictive covenants or ratchets that may reduce the flexibility of the biotech firms in their R&D projects.

=== Strategic alliances ===
SWORD is preferred over strategic alliances because it allows the biotech firm to retain potential significant rewards of the product development.

== See also ==
- Hybrid security
- Seniority (finance)
- Venture lending
