= Distribution waterfall =

Term used in private equity investing

In private equity investing, distribution waterfall is a method by which the capital gained by the fund is allocated between the limited partners (LPs) and the general partner (GP).

== Overview ==
In a private equity fund, the general partner manages the committed capital of the limited partners. The GP usually commits some amount to the fund (the "GP co-investment"), usually 1 to 2% of the commitment. When distributing the capital back to the investor, hopefully with an added value, the general partner will allocate this amount based on a waterfall structure previously agreed in the Limited Partnership Agreement.

A waterfall structure can be pictured as a set of buckets or phases. Each bucket contains its own allocation method. When the bucket is full, the capital flows into the next bucket. The first buckets are usually entirely allocated to the LPs, while buckets further away from the source are more advantageous to the GP. This structure is designed to encourage the general partner to maximize the return of the fund.

== Typical distribution waterfalls ==
Waterfalls usually consists of the following phases:

- Return of Capital
- Preferred Return
- Catchup
- Carried Interest

=== Allocation ===
Before the waterfall, the distributed amount is allocated across the partners of the funds. The partners include both GP and LP. The amount distributed to the GP is kept by the GP, while the amount distributed to each LP will then go through the waterfall and be redistributed between the GP and the LP.

==== Various Allocations ====
- Global per Commitment: Allocated in proportion to each Partner's commitment to the fund
- Global per Capital Called: Allocated in proportion to each Partner's cumulative called amount
- Global per Commitment, with a GP exception: The rule could be: 2% to the GP, and the remainder reallocated per commitment between the LPs
- Deal by Deal per Capital Called: In proportion of the amount called for this specific investment

==== Return of Capital ====
The first step of the waterfall is to return to the LP at least the amount it was called. We find here a lot of variations on what exactly has to be returned. This usually includes the capital called for investments, plus some expenses and fees.

===== Various Return of Capital =====
- Total Investment Contribution: Total Capital Contributed for Investments
- Realized Investment Contribution: Capital Contributed to Investments that are either fully realized or liquidated
- Investment and Expenses: Total Capital Contributed for Investments, for expenses attributable to investments and for operational expenses
- Specific Investment Contribution: Capital Contributed to the specific investment (for deal by deal)
- Specific Investment Contribution and Expenses: Capital Contributed to the specific investment, plus organizational expenses due to the investment, plus a pro rated amount of the operation expenses on the percentage of capital contributed

==== Preferred Return (or Hurdle) ====
Once the capital is returned, 100% will still be distributed to the LP until a specific internal rate of return (IRR) is reached. Regardless of whether the waterfall is global or deal-by-deal, this preferred return is always calculated on every cashflow.

The main variations here are in what is included in the payment cashflows. As contribution, the GP may choose to consider only the capital called for investment, or may include the capital called for fees and expenses. For the distribution, the amount previously distributed as carried interest may be excluded.

===== Various Preferred Return =====
- Capital Contributed: IRR calculated based on every distribution to the LP and every contribution called for investments.
- Global IRR: IRR calculated based on every distribution to the LP and every contribution called.

==== Catchup ====
Catchup is a bucket which is strongly favorable to the GP. The rationale of a catchup is to give to the GP all or a majority of the gain, until the share of the profit received by the GP equals the carried interest (a percentage of the total return, e.g., 20%).

The catchup is defined by two elements: an allocation (usually 80% to 100% allocated to the GP), and a target (defined by the carried interest, typically 20% for the GP).

Example:

- First, 100% to the investors (LPs) until they receive their Preferred Return;
- Then, a catchup of 80 to 100% to the GP until the GP has received 20% of the cumulative amounts distributed with respect to the Preferred Return and this catch-up provision; and
- Finally, allocate funds based on the carried interest allocation

===== Various Catchup =====
The allocation GP/LP may vary, from 50/50 between GP and LP to 100% for the GP. The target ratio may also be calculated in different ways:

- In proportion of the LP profit: Until the amount received by the GP equals x% of the amount received by the LP in preferred return and catchup
- In proportion of the total profit: Until the amount received by the GP equals x% of the amount received in total by the LP and GP in preferred return and catchup

==== Carried Interest ====
Carried interest is a simple allocation of the remaining amount between LP and GP. The most common carried interest allocates 20% of the profit to the GP.

== Multihurdle waterfall ==
A GP may decide to define many hurdle rates, each linked to a specific allocation. In this case, the higher hurdles are linked to allocations more favorable to the general partner. An example of hurdle would look like:

Hurdle	Carried Interest
Preferred return: 8%	10% / 90%
Hurdle 1: 11%	20% / 80%
Hurdle 2: 15%	25% / 75%

== European vs American waterfall ==
The European waterfall, or global waterfall, means that the hurdle threshold is calculated at fund level. The American waterfall, or deal-by-deal waterfall, calculates the hurdle thresholds for each deal. The American waterfall is more favorable to the GP than the European waterfall:

- The deal-by-deal waterfall distributes carried interest faster. With a European waterfall, the first distributed amounts are used to return the capital called by other deals. In the deal-by-deal waterfall, the first deal may return some carried interest if the deal IRR is above one of the hurdle rate.
- If the GP buys into a low-performing company, the bad performance will need to be compensated by very positive deals before the GP may reach the hurdles. In the deal-by-deal waterfall, the bad performances of a single company do not leak over the performances of the other companies.

To mitigate the effect of a deal-by-deal waterfall and to make it more attractive to LPs, private equity funds using an American waterfall may include a clawback clause in their LPAs.

== Clawback clause ==
When liquidating the fund, if the LPs were distributed less than the agreed preferred return, they claw back the missing amount from the carried interest distributed to the GP. The clawback clause is triggered at the very end of the fund, at a time when the General Partner may have already put the clawback amount to other use.

In August 2010, Blackstone Group returned $3 million in carried interest to the limited partner of a fund as part of a clawback provision.

== See also ==
- Liquidation preference
