= Spens clause =

A spens or spens clause is a provision in a security (for example a bond) which allows a borrower to repay the principal amount (and hence discharge their obligation to the lender) earlier than the contractual repayment date, on payment of a specified penalty, also referred to as a "make whole" payment, in excess of the principal (or face value) of the security. In the case of a bond, this type of early repayment is often referred to as "calling the bond". A spens clause may also apply to a preference share that is redeemed on a winding up.

== Overview ==
The spens clause protects lenders or investors in securities in two related ways - by requiring the payment of a make whole payment it makes calling unattractive to a borrower and hence less likely (since it might prove too expensive to redeem the security), but if the borrower does proceed with calling the bond, the lender receives compensation in the form of the make whole payment.

Such protection against prepayment is particularly important where the investor (lender) is an insurance company and the asset is being used to match guaranteed cashflows, for example in an annuity portfolio.

The term spens clause is mostly used in the UK. Similar provisions for US securities may be known as make whole clauses.

The unqualified term "spens clause" is sometimes used to refer to the specific situation where the make whole payment is calculated using the prevailing gilt yield at the point of early repayment with no adjustment. The term "modified spens clause" is then used to denote the situation where an addition is made to the gilt yield to calculate the make whole payment.

== Origin of the name ==
The spens clause is named after the investment manager who devised it. Even though the term is named after a person, it is typically used with a lowercase "s".

== Numerical example ==
Suppose a five-year corporate bond is issued at par (100) with a coupon of 6% pa payable annually. The borrower has the right under a spens clause to repay after three years based on a reference rate of the two year gilt rate plus 0.5%.

After three years, the borrower does decide to redeem the bond. At this point the two year gilt yields 2% and so the reference rate is 2.5%.

If the bond was allowed to run to maturity, the outstanding cashflows would be 6 in one year and 106 in two years. The amount payable to the bondholder is therefore $6(1.025)^{-1}+106(1.025)^{-2}=106.75$, or 6.75% over par.

== Spens clauses in the context of Solvency II Matching Adjustment eligibility ==
A spens clause is a requirement for a bond to be eligible for the Matching Adjustment provisions of Solvency II if it has an early redemption feature.

Consultants KPMG note the following:

Bonds that are callable but have a make whole or spens clause may be considered eligible if the clause ensures that the amount received by the insurer is sufficient to be able to reinvest in an asset of the same credit quality and receive the same cashflows. Assets that have a modified spens clause will provide to the insurer, when called, the future cashflows discounted at a reference rate (typically gilts) plus X%. The ability of the insurer to replace the asset will depend on the level of X. No regulatory guidance is given as to what level should be used and therefore companies have assessed, for each rating, the maximum make whole spread (i.e. value of X) that they will allow an asset to have in order to be considered eligible.

KPMG conclude that there is a wide range of answers with 14% of respondents selecting less than 25 bps and 29% selecting 75-99 bps.

== The effect of spens clauses on investor appetite ==
A paper presented to the Institute and Faculty of Actuaries discussed the attractiveness of various instruments to different types of investor with reference to the inclusion of a spens clause. It identified the following loan asset classes as potentially suitable for backing annuity funds provided a spens clause was included in order to manage prepayment risk:

| | Allowable, with no penalty | No, or with Spens |
|---|---|---|
| CRE Investment Loans | Y | Y? |
| Infra Loans | Y | Y? |
| Infra Loans | Y | N |
| Social Housing Loans | Y | N? |
| Equity Release | N | ? |

A report by consultants EY discusses the attractiveness of infrastructure investments in delivering a prosperous and sustainable economy. The report notes:

...the issuer of an infrastructure loan has to value cash flows beyond the point that an option is exercised (for example, to prepay) at a specified yield (often linked to government bond yields or similar benchmarks). They also must pay a fee representative of the insurers’ loss in future revenue on the asset. This protects the insurer from loss of future income or may make it prohibitively expensive for the issuer to take an early redemption, thus mitigating this risk. It is important to reiterate that there are a variety of borrower options embedded in typical infrastructure projects, making such a mitigation technique difficult to successfully implement.

A report by consulting actuaries Barnett Waddingham discussed the Prudential Regulation Authority's Solvency II: Matching Adjustment letter of Saturday 28 March 2015. In particular:

- Firms should consider the appropriateness of the reference gilt for callable assets with spens clauses.
- Where the spens clause on a callable asset is not sufficient to replace foregone cashflows, firms should consider if other illiquid assets with the same or better credit rating would be available to purchase.

== The Bank of England ==
The Bank of England's purchase scheme for corporate bonds favours bonds having a spens clause.

The Prudential Regulation Authority of the Bank of England refers to spens clauses in its application of the Matching Adjustment rules under the Solvency II framework for capital for insurance companies.
