= Accretion/dilution analysis =

Mergers and acquisitions financial modeling concept

Accretion/dilution analysis is a type of M&A financial modelling performed in the pre-deal phase to evaluate the effect of the transaction on shareholder value and to check whether earnings per share (EPS) for buying shareholders will increase or decrease post-deal. Generally, shareholders do not prefer dilutive transactions; however, if the deal may generate enough value to become accretive in a reasonable time, a proposed combination is justified.

Aside is a simplified example. A real-life accretion/dilution analysis may be much more complex if the deal is structured as cash-and-stock-for-stock, if preferred shares and dilutive instruments are involved, if debt and transaction fees are substantial, and so on. Generally, if the buying company has a higher price–earnings ratio (P/E) multiple than that of the target, the deal is likely to be accretive. The reverse is true for a dilutive transaction.

== See also ==
- Post-money valuation
- Pre-money valuation
- Pro forma § Financial statements
