= Stock dilution =

Decrease in existing shareholders' ownership percentage

Stock dilution, also known as equity dilution, is the decrease in existing shareholders' ownership percentage of a company as a result of the company issuing new equity. New equity increases the total shares outstanding which has a dilutive effect on the ownership percentage of existing shareholders. This increase in the number of shares outstanding can result from a primary market offering (including an initial public offering), employees exercising stock options, or by issuance or conversion of convertible bonds, preferred shares or warrants into stock. This dilution can shift fundamental positions of the stock such as ownership percentage, voting control, earnings per share, and the value of individual shares.

== Control dilution ==
Control dilution describes the reduction in ownership percentage or loss of a controlling share of an investment's stock. Many venture capital contracts contain an anti-dilution provision in favor of the original investors, to protect their equity investments. One way to raise new equity without diluting voting control is to give warrants to all the existing shareholders equally. They can choose to put more money in the company, or else lose ownership percentage. When employee options threaten to dilute the ownership of a control group, the company can use cash to buy back the shares issued.

The measurement of this percent dilution is made at a point in time. It will change as market values change and cannot be interpreted as a "measure of the impact of" dilutions.

1. Presume that all convertible securities are convertible at the date.
2. Add up the number of new shares that will be issued as a result.
3. Add up the proceeds that would be received on these conversions and issues (the reduction of debt is a 'proceed').
4. Divide the total proceeds by the current market price of the stock to determine the number of shares the proceeds can buy back.
5. Subtract the number bought-back from the new shares originally issued
6. Divide the net increase in shares by the starting # shares outstanding.

== Earnings dilution ==
Earnings dilution describes the reduction in amount earned per share in an investment due to an increase in the total number of shares. The calculation of earnings dilutions derives from this same process as control dilution. The net increase in shares (steps 1–5) is determined at the beginning of the reporting period, and added to the beginning number of shares outstanding. The net income for the period is divided by this increased number of shares. Notice that the conversion rates are determined by market values at the beginning, not the period end. The returns to be realized on the reinvestment of the proceeds are not part of this calculation.

== Value dilution ==
Value dilution describes the reduction in the current price of a stock due to the increase in the number of shares. This generally occurs when shares are issued in exchange for the purchase of a business, and incremental income from the new business must be at least the return on equity (ROE) of the old business. When the purchase price includes goodwill, this becomes a higher hurdle to clear.

The theoretical diluted price, i.e. the price after an increase in the number of shares, can be calculated as:

Theoretical Diluted Price = $\frac{O \times OP + N \times IP}{O + N}$

Where:

- O = original number of shares
- OP = Current share price
- N = number of new shares to be issued
- IP = issue price of new shares

For example, if there is a 3-for-10 issue, the current price is $0.50, the issue price $0.32, we have

- O = 10, OP = $0.50, N = 3, IP = $0.32, and
- TDP = (10 × 0.50 + 3 × 0.32) / (10 + 3) = $0.4585

=== Owners' share of the underlying business ===
If new shares are issued at a price at least equal to the current market value of the company’s outstanding shares, the existing shareholders do not experience an economic loss. In this case, they simply own a smaller percentage of a now larger company, and although their proportional voting rights decline, their wealth is not diluted.

However, when new shares are issued at a price below the pre-existing market value, existing shareholders may experience economic dilution unless they participate in the offering. Finance literature notes that shareholders can preserve both their voting power and economic position by purchasing a proportional number of the newly issued shares, a mechanism commonly reflected in preemptive rights and rights offerings.

=== Market value of the business ===
Frequently the market value for shares will be higher than the book value. Investors will not receive full value unless the proceeds equal the market value. When this shortfall is triggered by the exercise of employee stock options, it is a measure of wage expense. When new shares are issued at full value, the excess of the market value over the book value is a kind of internalized capital gain for the investor. They are in the same position as if they sold the same % interest in the secondary market.

Assuming that markets are efficient, the market price of a stock will reflect these evaluations, but with the increase in shareholder equity 'management' and prevalence of barter transactions involving equity, this assumption may be stretched.

Preferred share conversions are usually done on a dollar-for-dollar basis. $1,000 face value of preferreds will be exchanged for $1,000 worth of common shares (at market value). As the common shares increase in value, the preferreds will dilute them less (in terms of percent-ownership), and vice versa. In terms of value dilution, there will be none from the point of view of the shareholder. Since most shareholders are invested in the belief the stock price will increase, this is not a problem.

When the stock price declines because of some bad news, the company's next report will have to measure, not only the financial results of the bad news, but also the increase in the dilution percentage. This exacerbates the problem and increases the downward pressure on the stock, increasing dilution. Some financing vehicles are structured to augment this process by redefining the conversion factor as the stock price declines, thus leading to a "death spiral".

== Impact of options and warrants dilution ==
Options and warrants are converted at pre-defined rates. As the stock price increases, their value increases dollar-for-dollar. If the stock is valued at a stable price-to-earnings ratio (P/E) it can be predicted that the options' rate of increase in value will be 20 times (when P/E=20) the rate of increase in earnings. The calculation of "what percentage share of future earnings increases goes to the holders of options instead of shareholders?" is

(in-the-money options outstanding as % total) × (P/E ratio) = % future earnings accrue to option holders

For example, if the options outstanding equals 5% of the issued shares and the P/E=20, then 95% (= 5/105*20) of any increase in earnings goes, not to the shareholders, but to the options holders.

== Share dilution scams ==
A share dilution scam happens when a company, typically traded in unregulated markets such as the OTC Bulletin Board and the Pink Sheets, repeatedly issues a massive number of shares into the market (using follow-on offerings) for no particular reason, considerably devaluing share prices until they become almost worthless, causing huge losses to shareholders.

Then, after share prices are at or near the minimum price a stock can trade and the share float has increased to an unsustainable level, those fraudulent companies tend to reverse split and continue repeating the same scheme.

== Investor-backed private companies and startups ==
Stock dilution has special relevance to investor-backed private companies and startups. Significantly dilutive events occur much more frequently for private companies than they do for public companies. These events happen because private companies frequently issue large amounts of new stock every time they raise money from investors.

Private company investors often acquire large ownership stakes (20–35%) and invest large sums of money as part of the venture capital process. To accommodate this, private companies must issue large amounts of stock to these investors. The issuance of stock to new investors creates significant dilution for founders and existing shareholders.

Company founders start with 100% ownership of their company but frequently have less than 35% ownership in the later-stages of their companies' life cycles (i.e., before a sale of the company or an IPO). While founders and investors both understand this dilution, managing it and minimizing it can often be the difference between a successful outcome for founders and a failure. As such, dilutive terms are heavily negotiated in venture capital deals.

== See also ==
- Accretion/dilution analysis
- Diluted earnings per share
- Employee stock options
- Share capital
