= Exchangeable bond =

Type of hybrid security

Exchangeable bond (XB) is a type of hybrid security consisting of a straight bond and an embedded option to exchange the bond for the stock of a company other than the issuer (usually a subsidiary or company in which the issuer owns a stake) at some future date and under prescribed conditions. An exchangeable bond is different from a convertible bond. A convertible bond gives the holder the option to convert the bond into shares of the issuer.

The pricing of an exchangeable bond is similar to that of a convertible bond, splitting it into a straight debt part and an embedded option part and valuing the two separately.

== Pricing ==
Price of exchangeable bond = price of straight bond + price of option to exchange

- Price of an exchangeable bond is always higher than the price of a straight bond because the option to exchange adds value to an investor.
- Yield on an exchangeable bond is lower than the yield on a straight bond.
