= Share class =

Different types of shares in company stock

In finance, share classes or share classifications are different types of shares which together constitute a company's share capital but have different levels of voting (and often other) rights. For example, a company might create two classes of shares, class A and class B, where the class A shares have fewer rights than class B shareholders. This may be done to maintain control of a company by a group of shareholders or to make a company more difficult to take over.

For example, a company may create preferred stock as a poison pill so that the shareholders of common stock do not have the power to agree to a merger or takeover plan without the consent of the preferred stockholders.

There is no statutory procedure for converting shares from one class to another, but the provisions of the company's articles of association may be relevant. It may be done with the consent of all the shareholders affected. The safest course is to pass a resolution to which all the shareholders consent, since changing the rights on one person's shares may well have a practical effect on the rights of all the other shareholders.

== Classifications ==
The following descriptions are just examples of arrangements that might occur. Typical arrangements may vary between countries, and the following descriptions are partly specific to the United States.

=== Class A ===
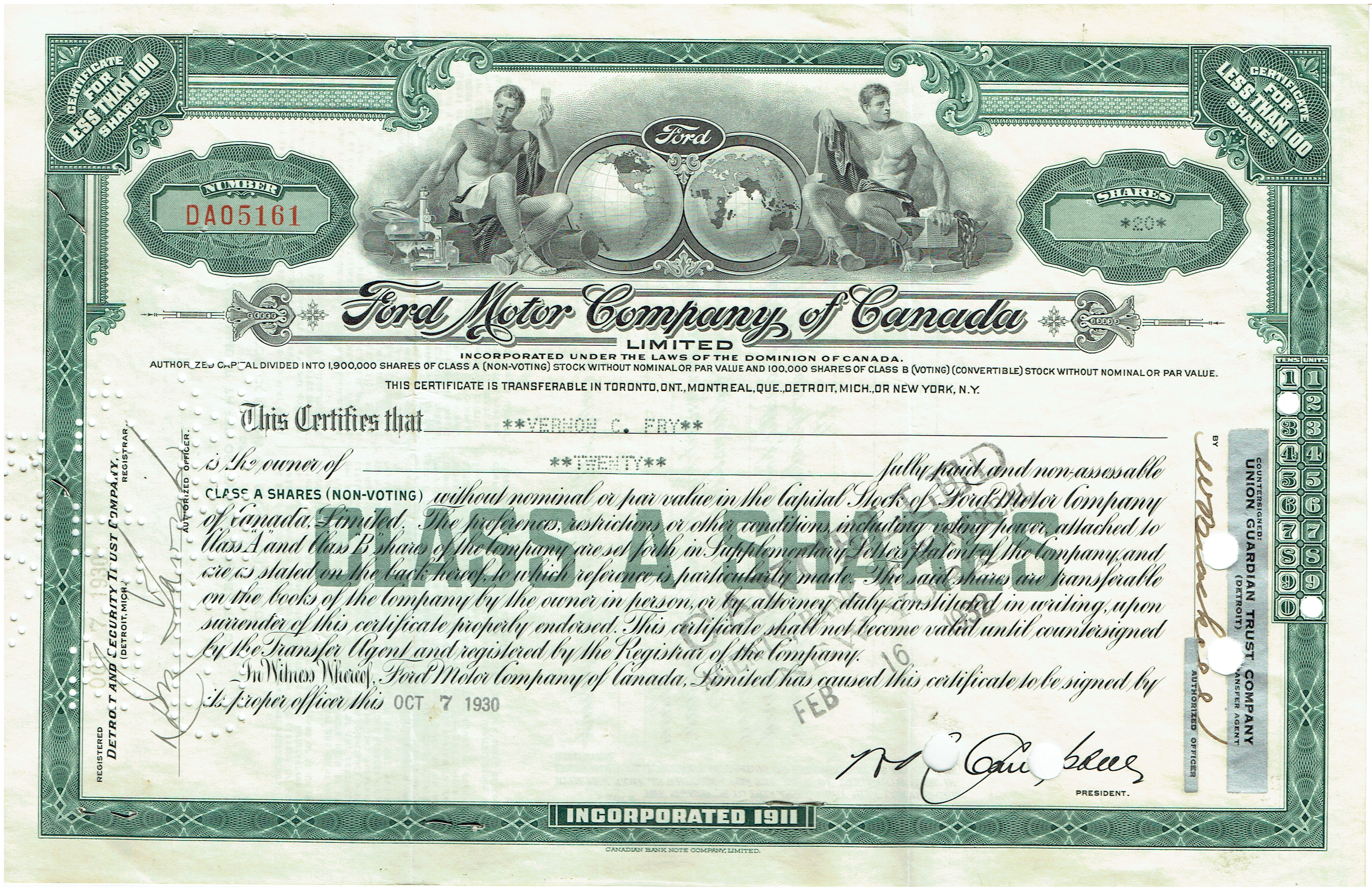
Class A share of the Ford Motor Company of Canada, issued 7 October 1930

Class A share refers to a share classification of common or preferred stock that typically has enhanced benefits with respect to dividends, asset sales, or voting rights compared to Class B or Class C shares. There may be restrictions on any specific issue of class A shares in exchange for the benefits; for example, preferences with regard to dividends may be traded for reduced voting rights. They are often convertible into class B (may not be publicly traded) shares at a favorable rate.

For example, a company might allocate class A shares to its management, giving them 7 times the face value of class B shares, while class B shares have the same voting rights as class A shares. Companies classify stock for many reasons. In some cases, this is to give company insiders greater power over the company and to provide a better defense against events such as hostile takeover attempts.

Class A shares is also a way of pricing sales charges (loads) on mutual funds in the United States. In a class A share, the sales load is up front, typically no more than 5.75% of the amount invested. In contrast, the class B share does not have an upfront charge but instead has higher ongoing expenses in the form of a higher "12B-1 fee" and a contingent deferred sales charge that applies only if the investor redeems shares before a specified period. The maximum A share sales load is decreased for larger investment amounts as a volume discount.

=== Class B ===
Class B shares are a type of classification of common stock or preferred stock, which may have more or fewer voting rights as compared to Class A shares, depending on a company's articles of association. In the event of bankruptcy, Class B shares may have a lower repayment priority as well.

Class B shares are financial instruments which represent ownership in a company and proportionate claims on its assets. They exist in companies with dual-class structures or with multiple share classes with differences in their voting rights attached to each class. The creation of multiple classes allow founders of the company to maintain ownership over their company and control the company’s direction. Additionally, having different share classes can be a way for companies to reward early investors: For example, certain companies may designate Class B shareholders as those who invested with the company before a certain period, allowing investors to enjoy benefits such as higher dividends compared to those in other share classes. These details are outlined in the company’s bylaws.

Class B shares may be traded on the stock market or over the counter, whilst other companies restrict the trading of Class B shares.

Class B shares and dual-class structures enable founders and other corporate insiders to gain near-total voting control over the company. They are frequently issued in the early years of a public company, so founders can execute their own vision without disruption while tapping into the public market's financing. Companies choose to mitigate the risk of exposing their governance and assets to the public market by defining different classes of shares to ensure corporate insiders are in control of the voting rights. With Class B shares in a company, authorities can assign different rights to different classes of stockholders. They use different classifications to address issues such as voting authority, dividends, and rights to capital and assets.

=== Class C ===
Some companies, such as Alphabet (Google) have three share classes; in Alphabet's case Class A shares have 1 vote, class B shares have 10 votes, and class C shares have zero votes but still have financial interests.

== History ==
While similar arrangements have long existed, Berkshire Hathaway introduced 517,500 new Class B shares into the market in 1996. The company defined the differences between Class A and B shares explicitly—stating that the Class B common stock has the economic interests equivalent to 1/30th of a Class A common stock, but has only 1/200th of the voting rights of a Class A common stock. This meant that each share of Class A stock could initially be converted into 30 shares of Class B stock at the holder's option.

Warren Buffett, the CEO of Berkshire Hathaway, said at the 1996 annual meeting that the intended purpose of Class B shares was to match the demand for those shares and prevent false inducements. Additionally, unequal voting shares are created so that owners of the company do not have to give up control, but can still tap into the public equity market for financing. The price of the new Class B shares attracted many small investors, whilst making Berkshire accessible to people with modest amounts of capital. Buffett's intention was to market Class B shares as a type of long-term investment to prevent prices from fluctuating from supply concerns. Since issuing the class B shares, Berkshire has refused to a Class A stock split, claiming that the high price of Class A shares creates an intentional barrier to entry, and that the company wishes to attract investment-oriented shareholders with long-term horizons.

Ever since, many companies, such as Meta, Groupon, and Alibaba, have incorporated the dual-class stock structure to ensure owners have control over their company, while reaching out to more potential investors at more attractive share prices.

== Investments ==
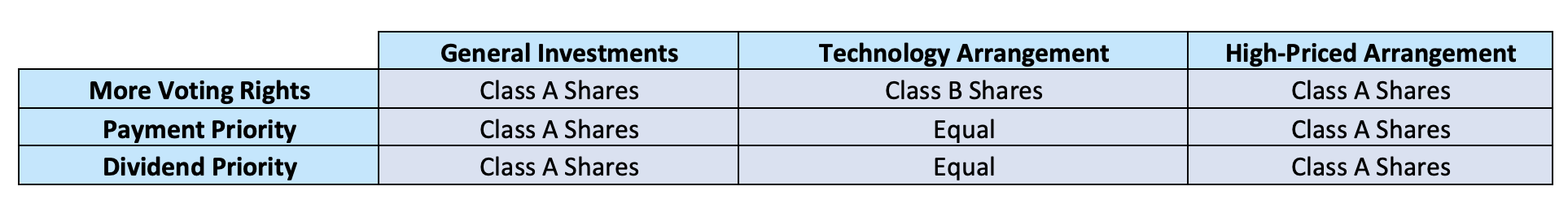
Difference in the Various Arrangements of Share Classes

Different companies have detailed descriptions of their different classes of stock written in their prospectus, bylaws, and charter. When there are a few classes of stock in a company, they are usually designated as Class A and Class B – where Class A shares carry more voting rights than Class B shares. The percentage difference in voting rights depends on how the company wishes to structure its stock. However, companies are not legally obliged to structure their classes this way – there are some companies which offer more voting rights for their Class B shares instead.

Class B shares are also usually lower in payment priority as compared to Class A shares. When a company goes bankrupt and is forced to be liquidated, Class A shareholders are likely to be paid faster than Class B shareholders. Class A shareholders also usually have dividend priority, which means that companies distribute dividends to Class A shareholders first.

=== Technology arrangement ===
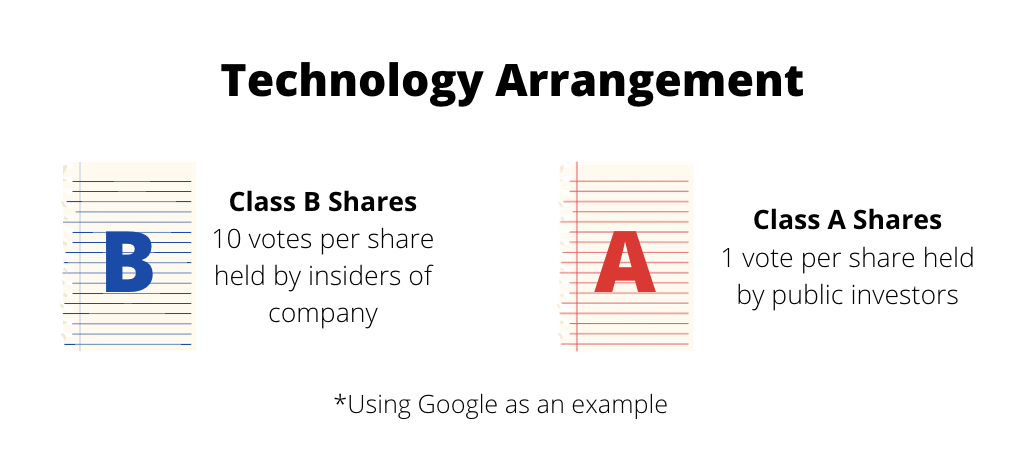
Difference in Voting Rights of General Technology Companies

The technology class arrangement derived its name from its popularity amongst technology companies. It usually involves insiders of a company having control over their Class B shares. The Class B shares have about 10 times the voting power of Class A shares, and are not traded on public exchanges. These shares are called "super-voting shares" as they give key company insiders larger control over the company which includes its board and is usually the deciding factor for corporate actions. Hence, the "super-voting shares" are usually not publicly traded. One popular example would be the "Google Share Class Structure". The purpose of this structure is argued to ensure stability of the company and prevent the board and management from feeling short-term pressure, which in turn allows them to focus on long-term goals.

=== High-Priced arrangement ===
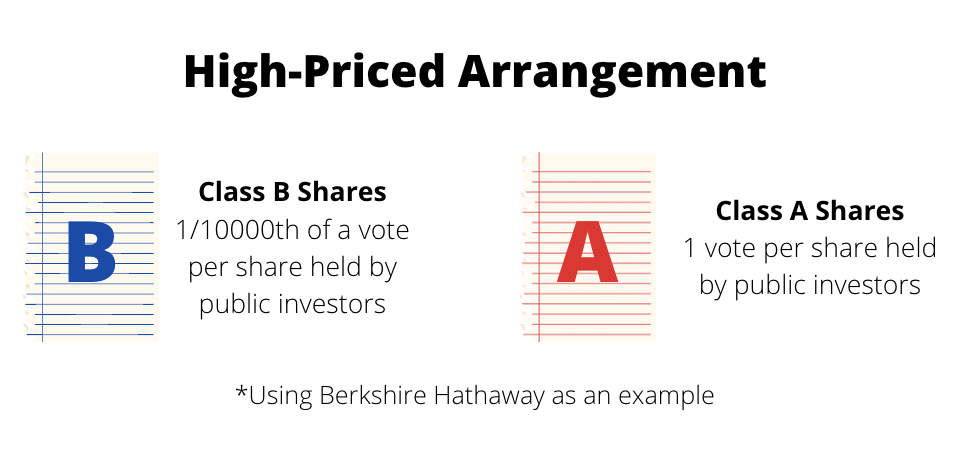
Showcases the differences in voting rights between Class A and Class B shares

Some companies value their Class A shares at extremely high prices. Although these Class A shares are publicly owned and traded on the market, they are generally out of reach for the typical investor. In these cases, firms create Class B shares which trade at a mere fraction of the Class A’s share. The Class B share, however, has only a small fraction of voting power. These companies create both share classes in a way where price and voting power are not proportional. One example of this arrangement is the Berkshire Hathaway structure.

=== Mutual funds ===
In mutual funds, there are a few differences which set the share classes apart. In terms of fees, Class A share funds charge a "front load", meaning that a percentage of the purchase amount has to be paid each time shares are bought as commission for the mutual fund’s managers. These front loads can go up to 5% or even higher. On the other hand, Class B share funds charge a "back-end load", also known as a "contingent deferred sales charge" (CSDC). This means that when the investor chooses to sell, a percentage of the dollar value of shares sold has to be paid. This back-end load, however, decreases directly proportional to the holding period of the fund, and is eventually eliminated. Class B shares can also automatically be converted to Class A shares after a specific holding period, which is beneficial because Class A shares have a lower yearly expense ratio.

Class B mutual fund shares are seen to be a good investment if investors have less cash and a longer time horizon. To avoid the exit fee, an investor should typically remain in the fund for five to eight years.

=== Preferred stock ===
Some companies may refer to their Class B shares as preferred stock. These stocks are described as a hybrid between bonds and common stock as it has features of both securities. These dividends which come with these shares are paid to shareholders before common shareholders when a company goes bankrupt. Preferred stockholders tend to have a higher claim on asset distributions or dividends compared to common stockholders. This is because of the higher risk assumed with the shares. More information on the preferred stock are dependent on the company and written in the company’s bylaws and charter. Preferred Class B shares generate income which gets preferential tax treatment, and most companies do not give preferred shareholders voting rights. These shares may also be convertible to a predetermined number of common stock, depending on the company’s bylaws. Shareholders’ dividends from these stocks usually yield more than common stock and are paid monthly or quarterly.

When preferred shares are issued, issuers avoid dilution of control as there are limited or no voting rights which come with the shares. Companies can also buy back the preferred stock and if the price is above the par value, investors may receive a profit from the stock.

== Classes ==
Companies can have the following classes:

- Ordinary shares
- Preference shares
- Non-voting stock
- Redeemable shares
- Convertible shares
- Deferred shares

== See also ==
- Partly paid
- Phantom stock
- Restricted stock
- Shareholder
- Stock option
