= Puttable bond =

Type of bond

Puttable bond (put bond, putable or retractable bond) is a bond with an embedded put option. The holder of the puttable bond has the right, but not the obligation, to demand early repayment of the principal. The put option is exercisable on one or more specified dates. Some bonds also have a conditional put that can be exercised upon the death of the bondholder.

== Overview ==
This type of bond protects investors: if interest rates rise after bond purchase, the future value of coupon payments will become less valuable. Therefore, investors sell bonds back to the issuer and may lend proceeds elsewhere at a higher rate. Bondholders are ready to pay for such protection by accepting a lower yield relative to that of a straight bond.

Of course, if an issuer has a severe liquidity crisis, it may be incapable of paying for the bonds when the investors wish. The investors also cannot sell back the bond at any time, but at specified dates. However, they would still be ahead of holders of non-puttable bonds, who may have no more right than 'timely payment of interest and principal' (which could perhaps be many years to get all their money back).

The price behaviour of puttable bonds is the opposite of that of a callable bond. Since call option and put option are not mutually exclusive, a bond may have both options embedded.

== Pricing ==
See also Bond option: Embedded options, for further detail.

Price of puttable bond = Price of straight bond + Price of put option

- Price of a puttable bond is always higher than the price of a straight bond because the put option adds value to an investor;
- Yield on a puttable bond is lower than the yield on a straight bond.
