= Common stock dividend =

Dividend paid to holders of a company's common shares

A common stock dividend is the dividend paid to common stock owners from the profits of the company. Like other dividends, the payout is in the form of either cash or stock. The law may regulate the size of the common stock dividend particularly when the payout is a cash distribution tantamount to a liquidation. Such cash dividends may serve the intent of defrauding creditors.

== Cash dividend ==
A cash dividend is the distribution of profits to the common stock shareholders, the owners of the corporation. Such distributions are in equal amounts to the shareholders depending on the portion of the company they own.

== Stock dividend ==
A stock dividend to common stock dividend owners distributes additional stock in the company to the common stock shareholders. Such dividends are evenly distributed to the shareholders depending on their portion of ownership in the corporation. Such distributions maintain their proportional ownership in the corporation.

== See also ==
- Common stock
- Dividend
- Dividend reinvestment plan
- Financial regulation
- Stock split
  - U.S. Securities and Exchange Commission (SEC)
