= Callable bond =

Type of financial instrument

A callable bond (also called redeemable bond) is a type of bond (debt security) that allows the issuer of the bond to retain the privilege of redeeming the bond at some point before the bond reaches its date of maturity. In other words, on the call date(s), the issuer has the right, but not the obligation, to buy back the bonds from the bond holders at a defined call price. Technically speaking, the bonds are not really bought and held by the issuer but are instead cancelled immediately.

The call price will usually exceed the par or issue price. In certain cases, mainly in the high-yield debt market, there can be a substantial call premium.

Thus, the issuer has an option which it pays for by offering a higher coupon rate. If interest rates in the market have gone down by the time of the call date, the issuer will be able to refinance its debt at a cheaper level and so will be incentivized to call the bonds it originally issued. Another way to look at this interplay is that, as interest rates in general go down on newly issued bonds, the market value of the bond goes up; therefore, it is advantageous to buy the bonds back at par value plus the fixed call premium. While this is a practical way to look at it, the corporation will not actually care if a par $100 bond trades at $110 or $1100 when called, since the bond cannot be resold once called. To the corporation the higher market value is just an indication of what it wants and from what it actually can benefit: to raise capital more cheaply with a new bond issue at the lower interest rate.

With a callable bond, investors have the benefit of a higher coupon than they would have had with a non-callable bond. If a bond is called after interest rates fall, investors may have to reinvest the proceeds at a lower yield to maintain a similar level of risk. This is comparable to selling (writing) an option — the option writer gets a premium up front, but has a downside if the option is exercised.

The largest market for callable bonds is that of issues from government sponsored entities. They own many mortgages and mortgage-backed securities. In the U.S., mortgages are usually fixed rate, and can be prepaid early without cost, in contrast to the norms in other countries. If rates go down, many home owners will refinance at a lower rate. As a consequence, the agencies lose assets. By issuing numerous callable bonds, they have a natural hedge, as they can then call their own issues and refinance at a lower rate.

The price behaviour of a callable bond is the opposite of that of puttable bond. Since call option and put option are not mutually exclusive, a bond may have both options embedded.

== Pricing ==
price of callable bond = price of straight bond – price of call option;

- Price of a callable bond is always lower than the price of a straight bond because the call option adds value to an issuer.
- Yield on a callable bond is higher than the yield on a straight bond.

== Make-Whole Call ==
Some bonds have a Make-Whole call feature. Rather than calling the bond at a predetermined price, a make-whole call adjusts the call price to reflect prevailing interest rates at the time of the call. The price is computed as the greater of the par value and net present value of the remaining interest and principal payments. The discount rate of the NPV is an agreed spread above the interest rate of a reference Treasury bond of similar term.

The advantage to the bondholder is that if interest rates drop, they are somewhat protected from the economic loss of the call.
