= Hybrid security =

Type of tradable financial asset

Hybrid securities are a broad group of securities that combine the characteristics of the two broader groups of securities, debt and equity.

Hybrid securities pay a predictable (either fixed or floating) rate of return or dividend until a certain date, at which point the holder has a number of options, including converting the securities into the underlying share.

Therefore, unlike with a share of stock (equity), the holder enjoys a predetermined (rather than residual) cash flow, and, unlike with a fixed interest security (debt), the holder enjoys an option to convert the security to the underlying equity. Other common examples include convertible and converting preference shares.

A hybrid security is structured differently than fixed-interest securities. While the price of some securities behaves more like that of fixed-interest securities, others behave more like the underlying shares into which they may convert.

== Examples ==
- A convertible bond is a bond (i.e. a loan to the issuer) that can be converted into common shares of the issuer. A convertible bond can be valued as a combination of a straight bond and an option to purchase the company's stock.
- A redeemable, or callable, preferred stock confers the issuer to repurchase the stock at a preset price after a specified date, converting it to treasury stock. Therefore, if interest rates decline, the company has the flexibility to redeem the stock and subsequently re-issue it at a lower rate, reducing its cost of capital.
- A PIK loan may carry a detachable warrant (the right to purchase a certain number of shares of stock or bonds at a given price for a certain period of time) – the loan is the debt (Bond), while the warrant is the equity

== Important terms ==
- Returns: Predictable dividend, often franked therefore possible tax advantage to the holder
- Capital price:

- Price moves in line with share price (fixed conversion terms e.g. 1 hybrid convert to 1 share)
- Bond like, price does not move in line with share price (variable conversion terms, face value (usually $100) convert to $100 worth of shares).

- Discount: A discount is usually offered to the share price at the time of conversion.
- Reset/resettable: At the reset date the terms of the security (dividend rate, next reset date) may change. The holder can elect to accept the new reset terms or convert into shares.
- Cumulative/non-cumulative This refers to the event of missed dividend payments.

- Cumulative: missed dividend payments are added to the next dividend payment.
- Non-cumulative: missed dividend payments are forgone.

- Redeemable/non-redeemable

- Redeemable: At certain times the holder may have the option to sell the securities back to the company at the face value/issue price.
- Non-redeemable / irredeemable: The company is not offering to buy the securities back.

== Basket D security ==
The most popular hybrid among financial institutions (banks and insurance companies) is the Basket D security. Basket D is a reference to a point on Moody's debt-equity continuum scale that treats the hybrid as 75% equity and 25% debt. In order to qualify, the security must give the issuer the right (or even the obligation) to roll-over the security at expiry to an indefinite or long maturity bond and to suspend dividends (effectively coupon payments, but to reflect the equity nature of the security, the term "dividend" is used). Most Basket D issuances have been structured in a way that also preserves the tax deductible nature of their interest payments, avoiding double taxation.

== See also ==
- Convertible security
- Convertible debt
- Monthly income preferred stock
- SWORD-financing, a special form of securities used in biotech industry
- Shareholder loan
- Venture lending
