= Pre-money valuation =

Venture capital term

"Pre-money valuation" is a term widely used in the private equity and venture capital industries. It refers to the valuation of a company or asset prior to an investment or financing. If an investment adds cash to a company, the company will have a valuation after the investment that is equal to the pre-money valuation plus the cash amount. That is, the pre-money valuation refers to the company's valuation before the investment. It is used by equity investors in the primary market, such as venture capitalists, private equity investors, corporate investors and angel investors. They may use it to determine how much equity they should be issued in return for their investment in the company. This is calculated on a fully diluted basis. For example, all warrants and options issued are taken into account.

Startups and venture capital-backed companies usually receive multiple rounds of financing rather than a big lump sum. This is in order to decrease the risk for investors and to motivate entrepreneurs. These rounds are conventionally named Round A, Round B, Round C, etc. Pre-money and post-money valuation concepts apply to each round.

== Basic formula ==
There are many different methods for valuing a business, but basic formulae include:

$$\text{Post-money valuation} = \text{New investment} \,\cdot\,  \frac {\text{Total post investment shares outstanding}}{\text{Shares issued for new investment}}$$

$$\text{Pre-money valuation} = \text{Post-money valuation} - \text{Investment amount}$$

== Round A ==
Shareholders of Widgets, Inc. own 100 shares, which is 100% of equity. If an investor makes a $10 million investment (Round A) into Widgets, Inc. in return for 20 newly issued shares, the post-money valuation of the company will be $60 million. ($10 million * (120 shares / 20 shares) = $60 million).

The pre-money valuation in this case will be $50 million ($60 million - $10 million). To calculate the value of the shares, we can divide the Post-Money Valuation by the total number of shares after the financing round. $60 million / 120 shares = $500,000 per share.

The initial shareholders dilute their ownership from 100% to 83.33%, where equity stake is calculated by dividing the number of shares owned by the total number of shares (100 shares/120 total shares).

Series A Cap table

	Pre-Financing		Post-Financing	
	# of Shares	Ownership Stake (%)	# of Shares	Ownership Stake (%)
Owner	100	100%	100	83.33%
Series A	-	-	20	16.66%
Total	100	100%	120	100%

== Round B ==
Let's assume that the same Widgets, Inc. gets the second round of financing, Round B. A new investor agrees to make a $20 million investment for 30 newly issued shares. If you follow the example above, it has 120 shares outstanding, with 30 newly issued shares. The total of shares after Round B financing will be 150. The Post-money valuation is $20 million * (150 / 30) = $100 million.

The Pre-money valuation is equal to the Post-money valuation minus the investment amount – in this case, $80 million ($100 million - $20 million).

Using this, we can calculate how much each share is worth by dividing the Post-money valuation by the total number of shares. $100 million / 150 shares = $666,666.66 / share

The initial shareholders further dilute their ownership to 100/150 = 66.67%.

Series B Cap table

	Pre-financing		Post-financing	
	# of Shares	Ownership Stake (%)	# of Shares	Ownership Stake (%)
Owner	100	83.33%	100	66.67%
Series A Investor	20	16.66%	20	13.33%
Series B Investor	-	-	30	20%
Total	120	100%	150	100%

Note that for every financing round, this dilutes the ownership of the entrepreneur and any previous investors.

== Up round and down round ==
Financing rounds can be categorized into three types: up round, down round, and flat round. This categorization may be used to quickly, but imprecisely, determine whether a round has been successful for company stakeholders. The precise definition of these terms has been debated by industry participants. Debate focuses on whether price per share or company valuation (specifically, comparing the current pre-money valuation to the post-money valuation of the previous round) should be used as the metric to categorize the round. The Wall Street Journal considers an up round (down round) to be when capital is raised at a share price above (below) the previous round. Similarly, the WSJ considers a flat round to be when capital is raised at the same share price as the previous round. Furthermore, in a survey of ten attorneys at different Silicon Valley law firms by the WSJ, eight said that share price should be used to categorize the round.

However, the other two lawyers surveyed by the WSJ argued that both share price and valuation should be used to categorize the round because it depends on perspective. For example, depending on how the deal is structured (such as how many new shares are issued during the round), it is possible for the share price to drop while the company valuation increases. That may be considered a down round to prior investors and founders but an up round to new investors. Moreover, according to the WSJ, some companies and investors argue that only valuation should be used to categorize the round, not share price. That is, they consider an up round (down round) to be when pre-money valuation of the current round is greater (less) than the post-money valuation of the previous round. Similarly, they consider a flat round to be when the pre-money valuation of the current round is the same as the post-money valuation of the previous round.

According to the WSJ's definition, in the examples above, the Series B funding was an up- round investment because its share price ($666,666.66) was higher than the share price of the Series A ($500,000). In other words, if the ratio of current investment and shares to be issued (for ex:- series B investment : shares issued) is greater than the ratio of Previous investment and shares previously issued (for ex:- series A investment : shares previously issued), then it will be up- round investment. If this current ratio is less than previous ratio, then it is down-round investment. If the ratios tie up, then it is flat round investment.

Successful, growing companies usually raise equity in a series of up rounds from institutional investors. For example, institutional investors such as venture capital firms, corporate investors, private equity firms, growth equity firms, and hedge funds may participate in up rounds. Eventually, such companies may achieve a successful exit for their investors and stakeholders. For example, the company may go public via an IPO, direct listing, or merger with a SPAC. Alternatively, it may become an M&A target. For example, it may be acquired by larger company or merged with a competitor.

In general, down rounds are adverse events for initial shareholders and founders, as they may cause ownership dilution, may damage the company's reputation, and may raise the company's cost of capital going forward. As a result, companies and investors may use financial engineering to structure a deal as an up round, even if the share price only increases by a penny. Down rounds were common during the bursting of the dot-com bubble in 2000–2001 and the 2008 financial crisis. As a result, a down round may not necessarily reflect poorly on the company. Rather, it may be the result of poor market conditions.

== See also ==
- Post-money valuation
- Capitalization table
- Accretion/dilution analysis
