= Common stock =

Form of corporate equity ownership

Common stock is a form of corporate equity ownership, a type of security. The terms voting share and ordinary share are also used frequently outside of the United States. They are known as equity shares or ordinary shares in the UK and other Commonwealth realms. This type of share gives the stockholder the right to share in the profits of the company, and to vote on matters of corporate policy and the composition of the members of the board of directors.

The owners of common stock do not directly own any assets of the company; instead each stockholder owns a fractional interest in the company, which in turn owns the assets. As owners of a company, common stockholders are eligible to receive dividends from its recent or past earnings, proceeds from a sale of the company, and distributions of residual (left-over) money if it is liquidated. In general, common stockholders have lowest priority to receive payouts from the company. They may not receive dividends until the company has met obligations on any preferred stocks it has issued, and they receive distributions in liquidation only after creditors (including employees), bondholders, and preferred stockholders have been paid. When liquidation happens through bankruptcy, the common stockholders typically receive nothing.

Since common stock is more exposed to the risks of the business than bonds or preferred stock, it offers a greater potential for capital appreciation. Over the long term, common stocks tend to outperform more secure investments, despite their short-term volatility.

== Shareholder rights ==
Owners of a company's common stock are entitled to rights that are enumerated in its articles, bylaws and applicable corporate law. These can include the right to vote on directors, officers, compensation plans and major business actions such as acquisition or dissolution. Many companies also allow them to submit and vote on proposals to amend the bylaws or to mandate actions by the board. Pre-emption rights and shareholder rights plans regulate the terms under which new shareholders can affect the interests of existing ones. Shareholders have the right to request access to the company's financial records, the list of shareholders, and other records that they legitimately require to fulfill their ownership duties.

== Classification ==
Common/Equity stock is classified to differentiate it from preferred stock. Each is considered a share class, with different series of each issued from time to time such as Series B Preferred Stock. Nevertheless, using "Class B Common Stock" is a common label for a super-voting series of common stock.

== Ownership rights ==
Common stocks exist on both public and private markets, however the accessibility differs because only publicly traded companies may have common stock publicly listed. Some companies may for various reasons delist some or all of their shares from the public market and common stock may then be converted to limited common stock, other stock or be liquidated altogether.

Common stocks listings may be used as a way for companies to increase their equity capital in exchange for dividend rights for shareowners. Listed common stock typically comes in the form of several stock classes in order for companies to remain in partial control of their stock voting rights. Non-voting stock may be issued as a separate class.

== See also ==
- Capital surplus
- Common stock dividend
- Equity (finance)
- Share capital
- Shares authorized
- Shares issued
- Treasury stock
