= Convertible bond =

Type of bond

In finance, a convertible bond, convertible note, or convertible (or a convertible debenture if it has a maturity of greater than 10 years) is a type of bond that the holder can convert into a specified number of shares of common stock in the issuing company or cash of equal value. It is a hybrid security with debt- and equity-like features. It originated in the mid-19th century, and was used by early speculators such as Jacob Little and Daniel Drew to counter market cornering.

Convertible bonds are also considered debt security because the companies agree to give fixed or floating interest rate as they do in common bonds for the funds of investor. To compensate for having additional value through the option to convert the bond to stock, a convertible bond typically has a yield lower than that of similar, non-convertible debt. The investor receives the potential upside of conversion into equity while protecting downside with cash flow from the coupon payments and the return of principal upon maturity. These properties—and the fact that convertible bonds trade often below fair value—lead naturally to the idea of convertible arbitrage, where a long position in the convertible bond is balanced by a short position in the underlying equity.

From the issuer's perspective, the key benefit of raising money by selling convertible bonds is a reduced cash interest payment. The advantage for companies of issuing convertible bonds is that, if the bonds are converted to stocks, companies' debt vanishes. However, in exchange for the benefit of reduced interest payments, the value of shareholder's equity is reduced due to the stock dilution expected when bondholders convert their bonds into new shares.

Convertible notes are also a frequent vehicle for seed investing in startup companies, as a form of debt that converts to equity in a future investing round. It is a hybrid investment vehicle, which carries the (limited) protection of debt at the start, but shares in the upside as equity if the startup is successful, while avoiding the necessity of valuing the company at too early a stage.

== Types ==
Although no formal classification exists in the financial market it is possible to segment convertibles into the following sub-types:

=== Vanilla convertible bonds ===
Vanilla convertible bonds are the most plain convertible structures. They grant the holder the right to convert into a certain number of shares determined according to a conversion price determined in advance. They may offer coupon regular payments during the life of the security and have a fixed maturity date where the nominal value of the bond is redeemable by the holder. This type is the most common convertible type and is typically providing the asymmetric returns profile and positive convexity often wrongly associated to the entire asset class: at maturity the holder would indeed either convert into shares or request the redemption at par depending on whether or not the stock price is above the conversion price.

=== Mandatory convertibles ===
Mandatory convertibles are a common variation of the vanilla subtype, especially on the US market. Mandatory convertible would force the holder to convert into shares at maturity—hence the term "Mandatory". Those securities would very often bear two conversion prices, making their profiles similar to a "risk reversal" option strategy. The first conversion price would limit the price where the investor would receive the equivalent of its par value back in shares, the second would delimit where the investor will earn more than par. If the stock price is below the first conversion price the investor would suffer a capital loss compared to its original investment (excluding the potential coupon payments). Mandatory convertibles can be compared to forward selling of equity at a premium.

=== Reverse convertibles ===
Reverse convertibles are a less common variation, mostly issued synthetically. They would be opposite of the vanilla structure: the conversion price would act as a knock-in short put option: as the stock price drops below the conversion price the investor would start to be exposed the underlying stock performance and no longer able to redeem at par its bond. This negative convexity would be compensated by a usually high regular coupon payment.

=== Packaged convertibles ===
Packaged convertibles or sometimes "bond + option" structures are simply a straight bond and a call option/warrant wrapped together. Usually the investor would be able to then trade both legs separately. Although the initial payoff is similar to a plain vanilla one, the Packaged Convertibles would then have different dynamics and risks associated with them since at maturity the holder would not receive some cash or shares but some cash and potentially some share. They would for instance miss the modified duration mitigation effect usual with plain vanilla convertibles structures.

=== Contingent convertibles ===
Contingent convertibles are a variation of the mandatory convertibles. They are automatically converted into equity if a pre-specified trigger event occurs, for example if the value of assets is below the value of its guaranteed debt.

=== Foreign currency convertibles ===
Foreign currency convertibles are any convertible bonds whose face value is issued in a currency different from issuing company's domestic currency.

=== Exchangeable bond ===
Exchangeable bond where the issuing company and the underlying stock company are different companies (e.g. XS0882243453, GBL into GDF Suez). This distinction is usually made in terms of risk i.e. equity and credit risk being correlated: in some cases the entities would be legally distinct, but not considered as exchangeable as the ultimate guarantor being the same as the underlying stock company (e.g. typical in the case of the Sukuk, Islamic convertible bonds, needing a specific legal setup to be compliant with the Islamic law).

=== Synthetic bond ===
Synthetically structured convertible bond issued by an investment bank to replicate a convertible payoff on a specific underlying equity. Sometimes referred also as Cash settled Bank Exchangeable Bonds (e.g. Barclays/MSFT 25 US06738G8A15 - Barclays Bank PLC is the issuer while Microsoft is the referenced underlying equity). Most reverse convertibles are synthetics. Synthetics are more similar to structured products with settlement done in cash and no equities being produced as the result of a conversion. The Packaged Convertibles (e.g. Siemens 17 DE000A1G0WA1) are sometimes confused with synthetics due to the fact an issuer (sometime a portfolio manager) will create a structure using straight bonds and options. There are in reality two completely different products with different risks and payoffs.

== Structure, features and terminology ==
- Coupon: Periodic interest payment paid to the convertible bond holder from the issuer. Could be fixed or variable or equal to zero.
- Maturity/redemption date: The date on which the principal (par value) of the bond (and all remaining interest) are due to be paid. In some cases, for non-vanilla convertible bonds, there is no maturity date (i.e. perpetual), this is often the case with preferred convertibles (e.g. US0605056821).
- Final conversion date: Final date at which the holder can request the conversion into shares. Might be different from the redemption date.
- Yield: Yield of the convertible bond at the issuance date, could be different from the coupon value if the bond is offering a premium redemption. In those cases the yield value would determine the premium redemption value and intermediary put redemption value.
- Bond floor: Also known as straight bond value, this is the value of a convertible bond's fixed income elements (regular interest payments, payment of principal at maturity and a superior claim on assets compared to common stock) excluding the ability to convert into equities.
- The issuance prospectus will state either a conversion ratio or a conversion price. The conversion ratio is the number of shares the investor receives when exchanging the bond for common stock. The conversion price is the price paid per share to acquire the shares when exchanging the bond for common stock.
- Market conversion price: The price that the convertible investor effectively pays for the right to convert to common stock. It is calculated as shown below. Once the actual market price of the underlying stock exceeds the market conversion price embedded in the convertible, any further rise in the stock price will drive up the convertible security's price by at least the same percentage. Thus, the market conversion price can be thought of as a "break-even point."

Market conversion price = market price of convertible bond / conversion ratio

- Market conversion premium: the difference between the market conversion price and the current market price of the underlying stock. Convertible bond buyers accept a conversion premium in exchange for the downside protection provided by a convertible bond's fixed income characteristics. As the stock price declines, the price of the convertible bond will not drop below its bond floor value. Usually expressed as on a per-share basis, the market conversion premium is calculated as follows:

Market conversion premium per share = market conversion price - current market price

- Parity: Immediate value of the convertible if converted, typically obtained as current stock price multiplied by the conversion ratio expressed for a base of 100. May also be known as Exchange Property.

Convertibles may have other features, such as:

- Call features: The ability of the issuer (on some bonds) to call a bond early for redemption. This should not be mistaken for a call option. A Softcall would refer to a call feature where the issuer can only call under certain circumstances, typically based on the underlying stock price performance (e.g. current stock price is above 130% of the conversion price for 20 days out of 30 days). A Hardcall feature would not need any specific conditions beyond a date: that case the issuer would be able to recall a portion or the totally of the issuance at the Call price (typically par) after a specific date.
- Put features: The ability of the holder of the bond (the lender) to force the issuer (the borrower) to repay the loan at a date earlier than the maturity. These often occur as windows of opportunity, every three or five years and allow the holders to exercise their right to an early repayment.
- Contingent conversion (aka CoCo): Restrict the ability of the convertible bondholders to convert into equities. Typically, restrictions would be based on the underlying stock price and/or time (e.g. convertible every quarter if stock price is above 115% of the conversion price). Reverse convertibles in that respect could be seen as a variation of a Mandatory bearing a contingent conversion feature based. More recently some CoCo's issuances have been based on Tier-1 capital ratio for some large bank issuers.
- Reset: Conversion price would be reset to a new value depending on the underlying stock performance. Typically, would be in cases of underperformance (e.g. if stock price after a year is below 50% of the conversion price the new conversion price would be the current stock price).
- Change of control event (aka Ratchet): Conversion price would be readjusted in case of a take-over on the underlying company. There are many subtype of ratchet formula (e.g. Make-whole base, time dependent...), their impact for the bondholder could be small (e.g. ClubMed, 2013) to significant (e.g. Aegis, 2012). Often, this clause would grant as well the ability for the convertible bondholders to "put" i.e. ask for the early repayment of their bonds.
- Non-dilutive: The non-dilutive feature has been popularized with the lower interest rates (e.g. in Euro) in order to make convertible issuance still attractive for issuers already benefitting from low interest charges in the straight bond market. In a non-dilutive placement, the issuer would simultaneously enter in an OTC option agreement with the underwriter (or a third party). This option would often match the strike of the convertible as well as its maturity. This would result in cancelling out the dilution in case of a conversion of the convertible at maturity if the stock price is above the strike. Typically, in order to fully prevent dilution the convertible prospectus would constraint possibility of early conversion.

== Markets and investor profiles ==
The global convertible bond market is relatively small, with about 400 billion USD (as of Jan 2013, excluding synthetics). As a comparison, the straight corporate bond market would be about 14,000 billion USD. Among those 400 billion, about 320 billion USD are "Vanilla" convertible bonds, the largest sub-segment of the asset class.

Convertibles are not spread equally and some slight differences exist between the different regional markets:

- North America: About 50% of the global convertible market, mostly from the USA (even if Canada is well represented in the Material sector). This market is more standardised than the others with convertible structures being relatively uniform (e.g. Standard Make-Whole take over features, Contingent Conversion @ 130%). Regarding the trading, the American convertible market is "centralised" around TRACE which helps in terms of price transparency. One other particularity of this market is the importance of the Mandatory Convertibles and Preferred especially for Financials (about 10–20% of the issuances in the US regional benchmarks). Most of the trading operation are based in New York.
- EMEA: European, Middle Eastern and African issuances are trading usually out of Europe, London being the biggest node followed by Paris and to a lesser extent Frankfurt and Geneva. It represents about 25% of the global market and shows a greater diversity in terms of structures (e.g. from CoCoCo's to French OCEANE). Because of that lack of standardisation, it is often considered to be more technical and unforgiving than the American market from a trading perspective. A very tiny amount of the volumes is traded on exchange while the vast majority is done OTC without a price reporting system (e.g. like TRACE). Liquidity is significantly lower than on the Northern American market. Trading conventions are NOT uniform: French convertibles would trade dirty in units while the others countries would trade clean in notional equivalent.
- Asia (ex. Japan): This region represents about 17% of the total market, with an overall structure similar to the EMEA market albeit with more standardisation across the issuances. Most of the trading is done in Hong Kong, with a minor portion in Singapore.
- Japan: This region represents about 8% of the total market as of January 2013 in spite of being in the past comparable in size to the Northern American market. It mostly shrunk because of the low interest environment making the competitive advantage of lowering coupon payment less appealing to issuers. One key specificity of the Japanese market is the offering price of issuance being generally above 100, meaning the investor would effectively bear a negative yield to benefit from the potential equity underlying upside. Most of the trading is done out of Tokyo (and Hong Kong for some international firms).

Convertible bond investors get split into two broad categories: Hedged and Long-only investors.

- Hedged/Arbitrage/Swap investors: Proprietary trading desk or hedged-funds using as core strategy Convertible Arbitrage which consists in, for its most basic iteration, as being long the convertible bonds while being short the underlying stock. Buying the convertible while selling the stock is often referred to as being "on swap". Hedged investors would modulate their different risks (e.g. Equity, Credit, Interest-Rate, Volatility, Currency) by putting in place one or more hedge (e.g. Short Stock, CDS, Asset Swap, Option, Future). Inherently, market-makers are hedged investors as they would have a trading book during the day and/or overnight held in a hedged fashion to provide the necessary liquidity to pursue their market making operations.
- Long-only/Outright Investors: Convertible investors who will own the bond for their asymmetric payoff profiles. They would typically be exposed to the various risk. Global convertible funds would typically hedged their currency risk as well as interest rate risk in some occasions, however Volatility, Equity & Credit hedging would typically be excluded from the scope of their strategy.

The splits between those investors differ across the regions: In 2013, the American region was dominated by Hedged Investors (about 60%) while EMEA was dominated by Long-Only investors (about 70%). Globally the split is about balanced between the two categories.

== Valuation ==
In theory, the market price of a convertible debenture should never drop below its intrinsic value. The intrinsic value is simply the number of shares being converted at par value times the current market price of common shares.

The 3 main stages of convertible bond behaviour are:

- In-the-money: Conversion Price is < Equity Price.
- At-the-money: Conversion Price is = Equity Price.
- Out-the-money: Conversion Price is > Equity Price.

From a valuation perspective, a convertible bond consists of two assets: a bond and a warrant. Valuing a convertible requires an assumption of

1. the underlying stock volatility to value the option and
2. the credit spread for the fixed income portion that takes into account the firm's credit profile and the ranking of the convertible within the capital structure.

Using the market price of the convertible, one can determine the implied volatility (using the assumed spread) or implied spread (using the assumed volatility).

This volatility/credit dichotomy is the standard practice for valuing convertibles. What makes convertibles so interesting is that, except in the case of exchangeables (see above), one cannot entirely separate the volatility from the credit. Higher volatility (a good thing) tends to accompany weaker credit (bad). In the case of exchangeables, the credit quality of the issuer may be decoupled from the volatility of the underlying shares. The true artists of convertibles and exchangeables are the people who know how to play this balancing act.

A simple method for calculating the value of a convertible involves calculating the present value of future interest and principal payments at the cost of debt and adds the present value of the warrant. However, this method ignores certain market realities including stochastic interest rates and credit spreads, and does not take into account popular convertible features such as issuer calls, investor puts, and conversion rate resets. The most popular models for valuing convertibles with these features are finite difference models as well as the more common binomial trees and trinomial trees. However, also valuation models based on Monte Carlo methods are available.

Since 1991–92, most market-makers in Europe have employed binomial models to evaluate convertibles. Models were available from INSEAD, Trend Data of Canada, Bloomberg LP and from home-developed models, amongst others. These models needed an input of credit spread, volatility for pricing (historic volatility often used), and the risk-free rate of return. The binomial calculation assumes there is a bell-shaped probability distribution to future share prices, and the higher the volatility, the flatter is the bell-shape. Where there are issuer calls and investor puts, these will affect the expected residual period of optionality, at different share price levels. The binomial value is a weighted expected value, (1) taking readings from all the different nodes of a lattice expanding out from current prices and (2) taking account of varying periods of expected residual optionality at different share price levels. The three biggest areas of subjectivity are (1) the rate of volatility used, for volatility is not constant, and (2) whether or not to incorporate into the model a cost of stock borrow, for hedge funds and market-makers. The third important factor is (3) the dividend status of the equity delivered, if the bond is called, as the issuer may time the calling of the bond to minimise the dividend cost to the issuer.

== Risk ==
Convertible bonds are mainly issued by startup or small companies. The chance of default or large movement in either direction is much higher than well-established firms. Investors should have a keen awareness of significant credit risk and price swing behavior associated with convertible bonds. Consequently, valuation models need to capture credit risk and handle potential price jumps.

== Uses for investors ==
- Convertible bonds are usually issued offering a higher yield than obtainable on the shares into which the bonds convert.
- Convertible bonds are safer than preferred or common shares for the investor. They provide asset protection, because the value of the convertible bond will only fall to the value of the bond floor: however in reality if stock price falls too much the credit spread will increase and the price of the bond will go below the bond floor. At the same time, convertible bonds can provide the possibility of high equity-like returns.
- Also, convertible bonds are usually less volatile than regular shares. Indeed, a convertible bond behaves like a call option. Therefore, if C is the call price and S the regular share then

$$\Delta=\frac{\delta C}{\delta S}\Rightarrow \delta C = \Delta \times \delta S.$$

In consequence, since $0<\Delta<1$ we get $\delta C < \delta S$, which implies that the variation of C is less than the variation of S, which can be interpreted as less volatility.

- The simultaneous purchase of convertible bonds and the short sale of the same issuer's common stock is a hedge fund strategy known as convertible arbitrage. The motivation for such a strategy is that the equity option embedded in a convertible bond is a source of cheap volatility, which can be exploited by convertible arbitrageurs.
- In limited circumstances, certain convertible bonds can be sold short, thus depressing the market value for a stock, and allowing the debt-holder to claim more stock with which to sell short. This is known as death spiral financing.

== Uses for issuers ==
=== Lower fixed-rate borrowing costs ===
Convertible bonds allow issuers to issue debt at a lower cost. Typically, a convertible bond at issue yields 1% to 3% less than straight bonds.

=== Locking into low fixed–rate long-term borrowing ===
For a finance director watching the trend in interest rates, there is an attraction in trying to catch the lowest point in the cycle to fund with fixed rate debt, or swap variable rate bank borrowings for fixed rate convertible borrowing. Even if the fixed market turns, it may still be possible for a company to borrow via a convertible carrying a lower coupon than ever would have been possible with straight debt funding.

=== Higher conversion price than a rights issue strike price ===
Similarly, the conversion price a company fixes on a convertible can be higher than the level that the share price ever reached recently. For example, compare the equity dilution on a convertible issued on a 20 or 30% premium to the higher equity dilution on a rights issue, when the new shares are offered on a 15 to 20% discount to the prevailing share price.

=== Voting dilution deferred ===
With a convertible bond, dilution of the voting rights of existing shareholders only happens on eventual conversion of the bond. However convertible preference shares typically carry voting rights when preference dividends are in arrears. Of course, the bigger voting impact occurs if the issuer decides to issue an exchangeable rather than a convertible.

=== Increasing the total level of debt gearing ===
Convertibles can be used to increase the total amount of debt a company has in issue. The market tends to expect that a company will not increase straight debt beyond certain limits, without it negatively impacting upon the credit rating and the cost of debt. Convertibles can provide additional funding when the straight debt “window” may not be open. Subordination of convertible debt is often regarded as an acceptable risk by investors if the conversion rights are attractive by way of compensation.

=== Maximising funding permitted under pre-emption rules ===
For countries, such as the UK, where companies are subject to limits on the number of shares that can be offered to non-shareholders non-pre-emptively, convertibles can raise more money than via equity issues. Under the UK's 1989 Guidelines issued by the Investor Protection Committees (IPCs) of the Association of British Insurers (ABI) and the National Association of Pension Fund Managers (NAPF), the IPCs will advise their members not to object to non pre-emptive issues which add no more than 5pct to historic non-diluted balance sheet equity in the period from AGM to AGM, and no more than 7.5pct in total over a period of 3 financial years. The pre-emption limits are calculated on the assumption of 100pct probability of conversion, using the figure of undiluted historic balance sheet share capital (where there is assumed a 0pct probability of conversion). There is no attempt to assign probabilities of conversion in both circumstances, which would result in bigger convertible issues being permitted. The reason for this inconsistency may lie in the fact that the Pre Emption Guidelines were drawn up in 1989, and binomial evaluations were not commonplace amongst professional investors until 1991–92.

=== Premium redemption convertibles ===
Premium redemption convertibles such as the majority of French convertibles and zero-coupon Liquid Yield Option Notes (LYONs), provide a fixed interest return at issue which is significantly (or completely) accounted for by the appreciation to the redemption price. If, however, the bonds are converted by investors before the maturity date, the issuer will have benefited by having issued the bonds on a low or even zero-coupon. The higher the premium redemption price, the more the shares have to travel for conversion to take place before the maturity date, and the lower the conversion premium has to be at issue to ensure that the conversion rights are credible.

=== Takeover paper ===
Convertibles have a place as the currency used in takeovers. The bidder can offer a higher income on a convertible than the dividend yield on a bid victim's shares, without having to raise the dividend yield on all the bidder's shares. This eases the process for a bidder with low-yield shares acquiring a company with higher-yielding shares. Perversely, the lower the yield on the bidder's shares, the easier it is for the bidder to create a higher conversion premium on the convertible, with consequent benefits for the mathematics of the takeover. In the 1980s, UK domestic convertibles accounted for about 80pct of the European convertibles market, and over 80pct of these were issued either as takeover currency or as funding for takeovers. They had several cosmetic attractions.

The pro-forma fully diluted earnings per share shows none of the extra cost of servicing the convertible up to the conversion day irrespective of whether the coupon was 10pct or 15pct. The fully diluted earnings per share is also calculated on a smaller number of shares than if equity was used as the takeover currency.

In some countries (such as Finland) convertibles of various structures may be treated as equity by the local accounting profession. In such circumstances, the accounting treatment may result in less pro-forma debt than if straight debt was used as takeover currency or to fund an acquisition. The perception was that gearing was less with a convertible than if straight debt was used instead. In the UK the predecessor to the International Accounting Standards Board (IASB) put a stop to treating convertible preference shares as equity. Instead it has to be classified both as preference capital and as convertible as well.

Nevertheless, none of the (possibly substantial) preference dividend cost incurred when servicing a convertible preference share is visible in the pro-forma consolidated pretax profits statement.

=== Tax advantages ===
The market for convertibles is primarily pitched towards the non taxpaying investor. The price will substantially reflect the value of the underlying shares, the discounted gross income advantage of the convertible over the underlying shares, plus some figure for the embedded optionality of the bond. The tax advantage is greatest with mandatory convertibles. Effectively a high tax-paying shareholder can benefit from the company securitising gross future income on the convertible, income which it can offset against taxable profits.

== 2010 U.S. equity-linked underwriting league table ==
Rank	Underwriter	Market share (%)	Amount ($m)
1	J.P. Morgan	21.0	$7,359.72
2	Bank of America Merrill Lynch	15.3	$5,369.23
3	Goldman Sachs & Co	12.5	$4,370.56
4	Morgan Stanley	8.8	$3,077.95
5	Deutsche Bank AG	7.8	$2,748.52
6	Citi	7.5	$2,614.43
7	Credit Suisse	6.9	$2,405.97
8	Barclays Capital	5.6	$1,969.22
9	UBS	4.5	$1,589.20
10	Jefferies Group Inc	4.3	$1,522.50

Source: Bloomberg

== See also ==
- Contingent convertible bond
- Preferred stock
- Convertible security
- Equity-linked note
- Exchangeable bond
- Liquidation preference
