= Residual claimant =

The residual claimant refers to the economic agent who has the sole remaining claim on an organization's net cash flows, i.e. after the deduction of precedent agents' claims, and therefore also bears the residual risk. Residual risk is defined in this context as the risk associated with differences between the stochastic inflows of assets into the organization and precedent agents' claims on the organization's cash flows. Precedent agents' claims on an organization's cash flows can consist of e.g. employees' salaries, creditors' interest or the government's taxes.

The concept of the residual claimant has been the subject of as well as used in over 8,000 scholarly articles, notably in law and economics, information economics and corporate finance. Its use can be traced back to the late 19th century and Francis Amasa Walker's 'residual claimant theory', which argues that in the distribution of wealth among profits, rent, interest and wages, the laborer is the residual claimant and wages the variable residual share of wealth, thereby going against the established view of profits as the residual share and igniting a debate with Simon Patten, Jacob Hollander and James Bonar.

Residual claimancy is generally required in order for there to be a moral hazard, which is a problem typical of information asymmetry. This is specifically the case for the principal–agent problem.
