= Non-voting stock =

Stock that provides the shareholder very little or no vote on corporate matters

Non-voting stock is the stock that provides the shareholder very little or no vote on corporate matters, such as election of the board of directors or mergers. This type of share is usually implemented for individuals who want to invest in the company's profitability and success at the expense of voting rights in the direction of the company. The investors still get dividends and can participate in capital gains as the shares can be bought and sold in the same way as normal shares. Preferred stock typically has non-voting qualities.

Many countries such as Germany, Russia, the United Kingdom and other commonwealth realms have laws or policies against multiple/non-voting stock. In the US, not all corporations offer voting stock and non-voting stock, nor do all stocks usually have equal voting power. Warren Buffett's Berkshire Hathaway corporation has two classes of stocks, Class A voting stock (NYSE: BRK.A) and Class B non-voting stock (NYSE: BRK.B). The Class B stock carries 1/10,000th of the voting rights of the Class A stock, but 1/1,500th of the dividend.

== Takeover ==
Non-voting stock may also thwart hostile takeover attempts. If the founders of a company maintain all of the voting stock and only sell non-voting stock to the public, takeover attempts are unlikely. They may occur only if the founders are willing to tender an offer by an unfriendly bidder.

There are consequences to not releasing voting rights to common shareholders; these include fewer supplicants for a friendly takeover, displeased shareholders as a result of the corporation's limited growth potential, and difficulty finding bidders for additional non-voting shares in the market. However, this is debatable since all publicly traded companies have their common shares in the open market for anyone to purchase. Examples include Tencent buying a non-voting 12% stake in Snap Inc. in 2017.

== See also ==
- Mergers and acquisitions
- Microeconomics
- Industrial organization
- Voting interest
