= Liquidation preference =

Term in venture capital financing

A liquidation preference is one of the primary economic terms of a venture finance investment in a private company. The term describes how various investors' claims on dividends or on other distributions are queued and covered. Liquidation preference establishes that certain investors receive their investment money back first before other company owners in the event the company is sold, has a public offering, pays dividends, or has another liquidation (payout) event.

== Types ==
Liquidation preferences can be partial (they apply to less than 100% of investment funds), full (100%), or at a multiple of original investment funds. Further, interest or guaranteed dividends may or may not be added to the preference amount over time. Occasionally the multiple shifts over time as well.

Another distinction is that preferences may be "participating", meaning investors receive their preference first and are then entitled to a share of any remaining funds based on their ownership, or they may be "non-participating", in which case they receive either their preference amount only with no further right to distributions, or else their proportionate share of distributions but without the preference, whichever is greater. For instance:

Participating liquidation preference: As an example, an investor invested $1M in a $6M pre-money valuation ($7M post) with a 2x participating liquidation preference. They would then own 14.4% ($1M/$7M) of the company and would get upside on any change of control. If the company then sold for $15M the investor would get back 2x of their investment first for $2M (2 × $1M) and then the rest of the remaining $13M ($15M – $2M) would be distributed among all shareholders. The investor would then get an additional $1.9M (14.4% × $13M) for a total of $3.9M ($2M + $1.9M).

Non-Participating liquidation preference: As another example using the same numbers as above, the investor has a 2x non-participating liquidation preference and a 14.4% ownership of a $7M post-money valuation. If the company again sold for $15M, the investor would have a choice of either receiving $2M (2 × $1M) for their liquidation preference or $2.2M (14.4% × $15M) for their participation. Thus the investor would then receive $2.2M.

== Preferred stock ==
Liquidation preferences are typically implemented by making them an attribute that attaches to preferred stock that investors purchase in exchange for their investment. This means that the preference is senior to holders of common shares (and possibly other series of preferred stock), but junior to a company's debts and secured obligations. There are several types of liquidation preferences related to preferred stock.

== See also ==
- Distribution waterfall
- Option Pool Shuffle
