= Dynasty trust =

Trust meant to last for multiple generations

A dynasty trust (also perpetual trust or generation-skipping trust) is an irrevocable trust established with the intention of spanning multiple generations of beneficiaries. Depending on local law, these trusts can last for hundreds of years or, in some jurisdictions, indefinitely.

== Primary functions ==
- Generational wealth transfer: Are designed to facilitate the transfer of wealth and assets to heirs beyond the grantor's immediate children, potentially benefiting grandchildren, great-grandchildren, and subsequent generations. This structure allows assets held within the trust to potentially grow and compound over extended periods, providing a long-term source of financial support or wealth preservation for the family line.
- Tax minimization: A central objective is the avoidance of federal transfer taxes—specifically estate taxes, gift taxes, and generation-skipping transfer (GST) taxes—as beneficial interests in the trust assets pass from one generation to the next. Generally, assets are subject to these transfer taxes only upon the initial transfer into the trust, provided the transfer amount exceeds the grantor's available exemptions.
- Asset protection: Dynasty trusts are structured to shield the assets they hold from the potential creditors or legal liabilities of the beneficiaries. The theory behind this is that the trust entity, rather than the individual beneficiary, holds legal title to the assets.

Grantor control: The creator of the trust (the grantor) establishes the governing rules and provisions within the trust document. These terms dictate how trust assets are managed and distributed over the long term, allowing the grantor to exert influence across generations. This control can be used to guide beneficiary behavior, promote certain values or philanthropy, or safeguard assets against potential mismanagement.

== Key characteristics ==
- Irrevocability: A defining feature is that dynasty trusts are established as irrevocable trusts, meaning once funded, the grantor generally cannot amend the trust's terms or reclaim the assets transferred into it. Neither the grantor nor the beneficiaries have direct control over the trust assets. Relinquishing control is necessary for the assets to be excluded from the grantor's taxable estate for estate tax purposes. Similarly, the asset protection features rely on the assets legally belonging to the trust, distinct from the beneficiary's personal assets, which is reinforced by the irrevocable nature preventing easy access or control by the beneficiary. However, this same essential characteristic leads directly to a significant drawback: the inherent inflexibility of the trust structure once established.
- Duration: These trusts are intended to last significantly longer than traditional trust structures. Their lifespan typically spans multiple generations and, depending on the governing state's laws, can extend for centuries or potentially forever.
- Complexity: Compared to standard revocable living trusts or simpler irrevocable trusts, dynasty trusts are generally more complex legal instruments. Their creation and continuous administration involve complex legal and financial considerations, often resulting in higher costs.

=== Table 1: Comparison of dynasty trusts vs. standard trusts ===
Feature	Dynasty trusts	Standard trusts (typical)
Duration	Designed for multiple generations; potentially hundreds of years or indefinite depending on state law	Typically limited duration; often terminates upon a specific event (e.g., beneficiary reaching an age) or after one generation
Tax efficiency	High potential for minimizing estate, gift, and GST taxes across multiple generations	Tax efficiency varies; assets often included in beneficiary's estate upon distribution
Asset protection	Strong protection from beneficiaries' creditors and divorce across generations	Moderate protection, typically ending when assets are distributed outright
Flexibility	Limited; typically irrevocable and difficult to change once established	Often higher; many standard trusts are revocable or amendable by the grantor or beneficiaries
Complexity	High; requires sophisticated drafting and long-term administration	Relatively lower complexity in setup and administration
Beneficiaries	Intended to benefit multiple successive generations	Often focuses on immediate beneficiaries (e.g., spouse, children) or a single generation

== Legal framework ==
=== Historical context and the rule against perpetuities (RAP) ===
The existence and structure of modern dynasty trusts are intertwined with the historical legal principle known as the Rule Against Perpetuities (RAP). Traditionally, the common law RAP acted as a significant constraint on the duration of trusts and other property interests. The classic formulation of the rule states that "No interest is good unless it must vest, if at all, not later than twenty-one years after some life in being at the creation of the interest". This meant that the ownership of property held in trust had to vest in a known individual within a timeframe measured by the lifetime of someone alive when the trust was created, plus 21 years. This rule primarily affected future interests where ownership was uncertain or conditional, such as contingent remainders and executory interests.

The rule aimed to prevent grantors from exercising "dead hand control" indefinitely, ensuring that property would eventually become freely sellable and preventing the creation of perpetual family dynasties that could tie up assets for centuries. The rule represented a compromise between respecting a property owner's freedom to dispose of their assets and the societal interest in preventing property from being locked in unproductive or undesirable arrangements forever.

Despite its intended purpose, the common law RAP increasingly become unpopular due to its complexity and often counterintuitive application. Its focus on possible future events, no matter how remote, rather than actual events, could invalidate perfectly reasonable estate plans. Hypothetical scenarios used to illustrate its potential pitfalls included the "fertile octogenarian" and the "unborn widow" (considering the possibility that a beneficiary's future spouse might not have been alive when the trust was created). These complexities contributed to efforts to reform or abolish the rule.

=== State law modifications and abolition ===
Beginning primarily in the mid-1990s, a significant legislative trend emerged in U.S. states to modify or completely abolish their respective Rules Against Perpetuities. This movement was driven partly by dissatisfaction with the complexities of the common law rule, but significantly by interstate competition to attract trust administration business. The Generation-Skipping Transfer (GST) tax and its associated exemption in 1986, created a strong incentive for wealthy families to utilize very long-term trusts. To leverage the GST exemption over multiple generations, trusts needed to exist longer than the traditional RAP allowed. This federal tax landscape created demand for jurisdictions with more lenient trust duration rules, prompting states to amend their laws to capture the substantial fees and capital associated with managing large, long-term trusts. Today, the legal landscape governing trust duration now varies considerably across states. Approximately half the states have effectively eliminated the RAP or extended permissible trust durations so significantly that they effectively allow for perpetual or near-perpetual trusts.

=== Examples of current state approaches ===
- Perpetual duration: Alaska, Delaware, South Dakota, Illinois, New Hampshire, New Jersey permit trusts to last indefinitely. New Jersey, replaced its RAP with a rule against suspending the power of alienation, which can typically be satisfied by granting the trustee the power to sell trust assets. Illinois allows trusts to opt-out of RAP.
- Long fixed terms: Other states have replaced the RAP with long fixed periods. Examples include Wyoming (1,000 years), Nevada (365 years), Florida (360 years), and Texas (300 years following 2021 legislative changes). Delaware permits perpetual duration for personal property trusts but limits real property trusts to 110 years.
- Shorter fixed terms or modified RAP: Some states have adopted the Uniform Statutory Rule Against Perpetuities (USRAP) or similar reforms, often resulting in a permissible duration of around 90 years, or retain versions closer to the traditional rule. California, for example, allows trusts to last approximately 90 years.

==== Table 2: State positions on rule against perpetuities (RAP) and maximum trust duration (selected examples) ====
State	RAP Status / Approach	Maximum Trust Duration
Alaska	Abolished	Perpetual
Delaware	Abolished (Personal Property); Modified (Real Property)	Perpetual (Personal Property); 110 Years (Real Property)
South Dakota	Abolished	Perpetual
Illinois	Allows Opt-Out	Perpetual (if opted out)
New Jersey	Repealed RAP; Replaced with rule against suspension of alienation (easily satisfied)	Perpetual (effectively, if drafted correctly)
Wyoming	Modified RAP	1,000 Years
Nevada	Modified RAP	365 Years
Florida	Modified RAP	360 Years
Texas	Modified RAP (effective Sept 1, 2021 for new trusts or those referencing statute)	300 Years (with 100-year limit on requiring real property retention)
Tennessee	Modified RAP	360 Years
California	Adopted version of Uniform Statutory Rule Against Perpetuities (USRAP)	90 Years

== Advantages ==
=== Minimization of transfer taxes (estate, gift, GSTT) ===
A primary goal for creating a dynasty trust is their potential to significantly reduce federal transfer taxes over multiple generations. When assets are transferred into a properly structured irrevocable dynasty trust, utilizing the grantor's applicable lifetime exemptions, those assets and any subsequent appreciation are generally removed from the grantor's taxable estate for federal estate tax purposes.

The more distinguishing tax advantage arises in future generations. Because the assets remain legally owned by the trust rather than the beneficiaries, they typically bypass inclusion in the beneficiaries' taxable estates upon their deaths. This avoids the imposition of estate tax at each generational transfer, which would occur if assets were passed outright from parent to child.

In addition, dynasty trusts are designed to address the Generation-Skipping Transfer (GST) tax. This federal tax imposes a significant levy (currently a flat 40% rate) on transfers made to "skip persons"—typically grandchildren or more remote descendants. Each individual possesses a substantial lifetime GST tax exemption (e.g., $13.61 million per person in 2024, though subject to legislative changes). By allocating this exemption to assets transferred into the dynasty trust, the trust can become GST-exempt for its entire duration allowing distributions to multiple generations of beneficiaries without triggering the GST tax.

The long-term nature of dynasty trusts, combined with the avoidance of recurring transfer taxes, allows assets within the trust to potentially compound and grow significantly over time. This can result in substantially greater wealth being available for later generations compared to scenarios where assets are taxed at each generational transfer.

An additional tax planning opportunity involves structuring the dynasty trust as a "grantor trust" for income tax purposes. In this structure, the grantor remains responsible for paying the income taxes generated by the trust's assets, even though those assets are outside the grantor's estate for transfer tax purposes. This payment of income tax by the grantor is not considered an additional taxable gift to the trust, effectively allowing the trust assets to grow income-tax-free from the trust's perspective and further reducing the grantor's own taxable estate.

=== Asset protection benefits ===
Dynasty trusts can provide robust protection for the assets they hold. When properly drafted, often incorporating "spendthrift" clauses, the trust assets are generally shielded from the claims of beneficiaries' creditors. This protection typically extends to various types of liabilities, including debts, lawsuit judgments, and claims arising from divorce proceedings involving a beneficiary.

The foundation of this protection stems from the legal ownership structure: the trust entity owns the assets, not the individual beneficiaries, therefore, creditors of a beneficiary generally cannot attach the trust assets directly or compel the trustee to make distributions, particularly if the beneficiary's right to distributions is discretionary rather than mandatory. This asset protection feature persists for the entire duration of the trust, offering an advantage over trusts that terminate and distribute assets outright to beneficiaries, at which point those assets become vulnerable.

=== Grantor control over long-term distributions ===
Dynasty trusts afford the grantor significant control over the management and distribution of wealth across potentially many generations. The trust document, crafted by the grantor, serves as a long-term blueprint dictating how assets are to be used. The grantor can specify the timing, amounts, and purposes for which distributions may be made.

=== Avoidance of probate ===
Assets titled in the name of a trust, including a dynasty trust, are not subject to the probate process upon the grantor's death. By transferring legal ownership of assets to the trust during their lifetime or arranging for transfer at death, grantors can ensure a more private and potentially more efficient transition of wealth management to the trustee for the benefit of the beneficiaries.

== Disadvantages and Criticisms ==
=== Complexity and expense ===
Dynasty trusts are inherently complex. Their establishment requires careful planning and sophisticated drafting by experienced legal counsel. The associated costs can be substantial, including significant upfront legal fees, which can range from several thousand to tens of thousands of dollars depending on complexity. Furthermore, ongoing administration incurs recurring expenses. These include trustee fees, particularly if a corporate trustee is used (often calculated as an annual percentage of trust assets, potentially 0.5% to 2%), as well as fees for accounting, investment management, and tax preparation, as dynasty trusts typically must file annual income tax returns. Often, legal and administrative fees exceed the amount the beneficiary receives.

=== Potential negative effects on beneficiary initiative ===
Concerns are raised regarding the potential impact of long-term trust arrangements on the character and motivation of beneficiaries. The assurance of perpetual financial support, even if distributed under specific standards, might reduce the incentive for beneficiaries to pursue their own education, careers, or develop independent financial discipline. Some critics view the structure as potentially fostering dependency or discouraging personal responsibility, referring to the grantor's influence as "dead hand control" aimed at managing heirs perceived as financially irresponsible. While grantors can attempt to mitigate these effects by incorporating incentive provisions or specific distribution standards within the trust document, the fundamental nature of providing long-term financial security without direct effort from the beneficiary remains a point of discussion regarding potential behavioral impacts.

=== Societal concerns (wealth concentration, inequality) ===
Dynasty trusts have become a focal point in debates about wealth inequality and economic mobility. Critics argue that by enabling vast fortunes to be shielded from estate and GST taxes generation after generation, these trusts facilitate the concentration of wealth within a small number of families. This process is seen as undermining the progressive intent of transfer taxes, which were designed, in part, to limit the perpetuation of dynastic wealth. The longevity of dynasty trusts are cited as evidence of trillions of dollars being hidden from the tax system.

=== Irrevocability and inflexibility ===
One of the most frequently cited practical disadvantage of dynasty trusts is inherent inflexibility. Once the trust is created and funded, the grantor loses the ability to easily modify its terms or reclaim the assets. Beneficiaries also generally lack the power to change the trust's provisions.

This rigidity poses significant challenges given the extremely long potential lifespan of these trusts. Over decades or centuries, family circumstances inevitably change: beneficiaries may develop unforeseen needs, disabilities, or marital situations; new descendants may be born; laws governing taxes, property, or trusts may be altered; and economic conditions or investment opportunities can shift dramatically. An irrevocable trust drafted generations prior may prove ill-suited or even detrimental in light of future developments.

While modern trust law offers some mechanisms to potentially modify irrevocable trusts, these processes are often complex, costly, and not guaranteed to succeed. Options might include:

- Decanting: This involves a trustee "pouring" the assets from the existing trust into a new trust with updated terms, if permitted by state law and the original trust document.
- Nonjudicial settlement agreements: Agreements between the trustee and beneficiaries to modify administrative terms, if allowed by state statute.
- Trust protectors: Appointing an independent third party (a trust protector) in the trust document with specific powers to amend the trust or change trustees.
- Judicial modification: Petitioning a court to approve changes, often requiring consent from all parties or demonstrating unforeseen circumstances frustrating the trust's purpose

Despite these potential tools, the fundamental inflexibility remains a key drawback. The rigid structure can be a source of frustration and conflict among beneficiaries who may feel constrained by outdated provisions or disagree with the trustee's interpretation or management, potentially leading to disputes and litigation. Beneficiaries may find the ongoing restrictions of a dynasty trust frustrating.

== Administration ==
Once established and funded, the ongoing administration of a dynasty trust is managed by the trustee(s) according to the terms of the trust document and applicable law. This involves significant responsibilities and careful decision-making over the trust's potentially very long lifespan.

=== Trustee responsibilities and fiduciary duties ===
The trustee acts in a fiduciary capacity, meaning they have a legal and ethical obligation to act solely in the best interests of the trust beneficiaries. Key duties include:

- Duty of loyalty and impartiality: The trustee must administer the trust solely for the benefit of the beneficiaries, avoiding self-dealing or conflicts of interest. They must also treat beneficiaries impartially, considering the interests of both current income beneficiaries and future remainder beneficiaries, unless the trust document specifies otherwise.
- Prudent administration: This involves managing trust assets effectively, taking control of and safeguarding property, keeping assets properly titled in the trust's name, ensuring adequate insurance, and managing any real estate or business interests held by the trust.
- Record-keeping: Maintaining detailed and accurate records of all trust activities is essential. This includes tracking income, expenses, distributions, investments, asset values (including cost basis), and documenting any discretionary decisions made by the trustee.
- Communication: Trustees have a duty to keep beneficiaries reasonably informed about the trust and its administration. This typically involves providing regular account statements and notifying beneficiaries of significant events or decisions affecting their interests. State law may impose specific notification requirements.
- Tax compliance: The trustee is responsible for all tax matters related to the trust. This includes filing annual federal and state fiduciary income tax returns (e.g., Form 1041), paying any income tax owed by the trust, making estimated tax payments, managing capital gains, and providing necessary tax information (like Schedule K-1) to beneficiaries who receive distributions. Unless structured as a grantor trust where the grantor pays the income tax, the trust itself is typically a separate taxable entity.
- Making distributions: A core function is distributing trust income and/or principal to beneficiaries as directed by the trust instrument. This requires careful interpretation of the distribution standards and exercise of discretion where granted.
- Enforcing and defending claims: The trustee is responsible for enforcing claims held by the trust and defending against claims brought against the trust.
- Trust termination: If and when the trust terminates according to its terms or applicable law, the trustee manages the final distribution of assets to the remainder beneficiaries and settles all final expenses and obligations.
