= Asset allocation =

Investment strategy

Example investment portfolio with a diverse asset allocation

Asset allocation is the implementation of an investment strategy that attempts to balance risk versus reward by adjusting the percentage of each asset in an investment portfolio according to the investor's risk tolerance, goals and investment time frame. The focus is on the characteristics of the overall portfolio. Such a strategy contrasts with an approach that focuses on individual assets.

== Description ==
Many financial experts argue that asset allocation is an important factor in determining returns for an investment portfolio. Asset allocation is based on the principle that different assets perform differently in different market and economic conditions.

A fundamental justification for asset allocation is the notion that different asset classes offer returns that are not perfectly correlated, hence diversification reduces the overall risk in terms of the variability of returns for a given level of expected return. Because correlations between asset classes may change over time, diversification can reduce portfolio volatility but cannot eliminate market risk or guarantee positive returns. Asset diversification has been described as "the only free lunch you will find in the investment game". Academic research has painstakingly explained the importance and benefits of asset allocation and the problems of active management (see academic studies section below).

Although the risk is reduced as long as correlations are not perfect, it is typically forecast (wholly or in part) based on statistical relationships (like correlation and variance) that existed over some past period. Expectations for return are often derived in the same way. Studies of these forecasting methods constitute an important direction of academic research.

When such backward-looking approaches are used to forecast future returns or risks using the traditional mean-variance optimization approach to the asset allocation of modern portfolio theory (MPT), the strategy is, in fact, predicting future risks and returns based on history. As there is no guarantee that past relationships will continue in the future, this is one of the "weak links" in traditional asset allocation strategies as derived from MPT. Other, more subtle weaknesses include seemingly minor errors in forecasting leading to recommended allocations that are grossly skewed from investment mandates and/or impractical—often even violating an investment manager's "common sense" understanding of a tenable portfolio-allocation strategy.

== Asset classes ==
An asset class is a group of economic resources sharing similar characteristics, such as riskiness and return. There are many types of assets that may or may not be included in an asset allocation strategy.

=== Traditional assets ===
The "traditional" asset classes are stocks, bonds, and cash:

- Stocks: value, dividend, growth, or sector-specific (or a "blend" of any two or more of the preceding); large-cap versus mid-cap, small-cap or micro-cap; domestic, foreign (developed), emerging or frontier markets
- Bonds (fixed income securities more generally): investment-grade or junk (high-yield); government or corporate; short-term, intermediate, long-term; domestic, foreign, emerging markets
- Cash and cash equivalents (e.g., deposit account, money market fund)

Allocation among these three provides a starting point. Usually included are hybrid instruments such as convertible bonds and preferred stocks, counting as a mixture of bonds and stocks.

=== Alternative assets ===
Other alternative assets that may be considered include:

- Valuable economic goods and consumer goods such as precious metals and other valuable tangible goods.
- Commercial or residential real estate (also REITs)
- Collectibles such as art, coins, or stamps
- Insurance products (annuity, life settlements, catastrophe bonds, personal life insurance products, etc.)
- Derivatives such as options, collateralized debt, and futures
- Foreign currency
- Venture capital
- Private equity
- Distressed securities
- Infrastructure

== Allocation strategy ==
There are several types of asset allocation strategies based on investment goals, risk tolerance, time frames and diversification. The most common forms of asset allocation are: strategic, dynamic, tactical, and core-satellite.

=== Strategic asset allocation ===
The primary goal of strategic asset allocation is to create an asset mix that seeks to provide the optimal balance between expected risk and return for a long-term investment horizon. Generally speaking, strategic asset allocation strategies are agnostic to economic environments, i.e., they do not change their allocation postures relative to changing market or economic conditions.

=== Dynamic asset allocation ===
Dynamic asset allocation is similar to strategic asset allocation in that portfolios are built by allocating to an asset mix that seeks to provide the optimal balance between expected risk and return for a long-term investment horizon. Like strategic allocation strategies, dynamic strategies largely retain exposure to their original asset classes; however, unlike strategic strategies, dynamic asset allocation portfolios will adjust their postures over time relative to changes in the economic environment.

=== Tactical asset allocation ===
Tactical asset allocation is a strategy in which an investor takes a more active approach that tries to position a portfolio into those assets, sectors, or individual stocks that show the most potential for perceived gains. While an original asset mix is formulated much like strategic and dynamic portfolio, tactical strategies are often traded more actively and are free to move entirely in and out of their core asset classes.

=== Core-satellite asset allocation ===
Core-satellite allocation strategies generally contain a 'core' strategic element making up the most significant portion of the portfolio, while applying a dynamic or tactical 'satellite' strategy that makes up a smaller part of the portfolio. In this way, core-satellite allocation strategies are a hybrid of the strategic and dynamic/tactical allocation strategies mentioned above.

== Classification ==
Industry sectors may be classified according to an industry classification taxonomy (such as the Industry Classification Benchmark). The top-level sectors may be grouped as below:

- Morningstar X-ray
  - Defensive
    - Consumer Staples
    - Health Care
    - Utilities
  - Sensitive
    - Energy
    - Industrials
    - Technology
    - Telecommunications
  - Cyclical
    - Consumer Discretionary
    - Basic Materials
    - Financials
    - Real Estate

Per the Tactical asset allocation strategy above, an investor may allocate more to cyclical sectors when the economy is showing gains, and more to defensive when it is not.

== Academic studies ==
In 1986, Gary P. Brinson, L. Randolph Hood, and SEI's Gilbert L. Beebower (BHB) published a study about asset allocation of 91 large pension funds measured from 1974 to 1983. They replaced the pension funds' stock, bond, and cash selections with corresponding market indexes. The indexed quarterly return was found to be higher than the pension plan's actual quarterly return. The two quarterly return series' linear correlation was measured at 96.7%, with shared variance of 93.6%. A 1991 follow-up study by Brinson, Singer, and Beebower measured variance of 91.5%. The conclusion of the study was that replacing active choices with simple asset classes worked just as well as, if not even better than, professional pension managers. Also, a small number of asset classes was sufficient for financial planning. Financial advisors often pointed to this study to support the idea that asset allocation is more important than all other concerns, which the BHB study is incorrectly thought to have lumped together as "market timing" but was actually policy selection. One problem with the Brinson study was that the cost factor in the two return series was not clearly discussed. However, in response to a letter to the editor, Hood noted that the returns series were gross of management fees.

In 1997, William Jahnke initiated a debate on this topic, attacking the BHB study in a paper titled "The Asset Allocation Hoax". The Jahnke discussion appeared in the Journal of Financial Planning as an opinion piece, not a peer reviewed article. Jahnke's main criticism, still undisputed, was that BHB's use of quarterly data dampens the impact of compounding slight portfolio disparities over time, relative to the benchmark. One could compound 2% and 2.15% quarterly over 20 years and see the sizable difference in cumulative return. However, the difference is still 15 basis points (hundredths of a percent) per quarter; the difference is one of perception, not fact.

In 2000, Ibbotson and Kaplan used five asset classes in their study "Does Asset Allocation Policy Explain 40, 90, or 100 Percent of Performance?". The asset classes included were large-cap US stock, small-cap US stock, non-US stock, US bonds, and cash. Ibbotson and Kaplan examined the 10-year return of 94 US balanced mutual funds versus the corresponding indexed returns. This time, after properly adjusting for the cost of running index funds, the actual returns again failed to beat index returns. The linear correlation between monthly index return series and the actual monthly actual return series was measured at 90.2%, with shared variance of 81.4%. Ibbotson concluded 1) that asset allocation explained 40% of the variation of returns across funds, and 2) that it explained virtually 100% of the level of fund returns. Gary Brinson has expressed his general agreement with the Ibbotson-Kaplan conclusions.

In both studies, it is misleading to make statements such as "asset allocation explains 93.6% of investment return". Even "asset allocation explains 93.6% of quarterly performance variance" leaves much to be desired, because the shared variance could be from pension funds' operating structure. Hood, however, rejects this interpretation on the grounds that pension plans, in particular, cannot cross-share risks and that they are explicitly singular entities, rendering shared variance irrelevant. The statistics were most helpful when used to demonstrate the similarity of the index return series and the actual return series.

A 2000 paper by Meir Statman found that using the same parameters that explained BHB's 93.6% variance result, a hypothetical financial advisor with perfect foresight in tactical asset allocation performed 8.1% better per year, yet the strategic asset allocation still explained 89.4% of the variance. Thus, explaining variance does not explain performance. Statman says that strategic asset allocation is movement along the efficient frontier, whereas tactical asset allocation involves movement of the efficient frontier. A more common sense explanation of the Brinson, Hood, and Beebower study is that asset allocation explains more than 90% of the volatility of returns of an overall portfolio, but will not explain the ending results of your portfolio over long periods of time. Hood notes in his review of the material over 20 years, however, that explaining performance over time is possible with the BHB approach but was not the focus of the original paper.

Bekkers, Doeswijk and Lam (2009) investigate the diversification benefits for a portfolio by distinguishing ten different investment categories simultaneously in a mean-variance analysis as well as a market portfolio approach. The results suggest that real estate, commodities, and high yield add the most value to the traditional asset mix of stocks, bonds, and cash. A study with such broad coverage of asset classes has not been conducted before, not in the context of determining capital market expectations and performing a mean-variance analysis, neither in assessing the global market portfolio.

Doeswijk, Lam and Swinkels (2014) argue that the portfolio of the average investor contains important information for strategic asset allocation purposes. This portfolio shows the relative value of all assets according to the market crowd, which one could interpret as a benchmark or the optimal portfolio for the average investor. The authors determine the market values of equities, private equity, real estate, high yield bonds, emerging debt, non-government bonds, government bonds, inflation linked bonds, commodities, and hedge funds. For this range of assets, they estimate the invested global market portfolio for the period 1990 to 2012. For the main asset categories equities, real estate, non-government bonds, and government bonds they extend the period to 1959 until 2012.

Doeswijk, Lam and Swinkels (2019) show that the global market portfolio realizes a compounded real return of 4.45% per year with a standard deviation of 11.2% from 1960 until 2017. In the inflationary period from 1960 to 1979, the compounded real return of the global market portfolio is 3.24% per year, while this is 6.01% per year in the disinflationary period from 1980 to 2017. The average return during recessions was -1.96% per year, versus 7.72% per year during expansions. The reward for the average investor over the period 1960 to 2017 is a compounded return of 3.39% points above the risk-less rate earned by savers.

=== Performance indicators ===
McGuigan described an examination of funds that were in the top quartile of performance during 1983 to 1993. During the second measurement period of 1993 to 2003, only 28.57% of the funds remained in the top quartile. 33.33% of the funds dropped to the second quartile. The rest of the funds dropped to the third or fourth quartile.

In fact, low cost was a more reliable indicator of performance. Bogle noted that an examination of five-year performance data of large-cap blend funds revealed that the lowest cost quartile funds had the best performance, and the highest cost quartile funds had the worst performance.

== Return versus risk trade-off ==
In asset allocation planning, the decision on the amount of stocks versus bonds in one's portfolio is a very important decision. Simply buying stocks without regard of a possible recession period can result in panic selling later. One's true risk tolerance can be hard to gauge until having experienced a real declining market with money invested in the market. Finding the proper balance is key.

Cumulative return after inflation from 2000-to-2002 bear market
80% stock / 20% bond	−34.35%
70% stock / 30% bond	−25.81%
60% stock / 40% bond	−19.99%
50% stock / 50% bond	−13.87%
40% stock / 60% bond	−7.46%
30% stock / 70% bond	−0.74%
20% stock / 80% bond	+6.29%

Projected 10-year Cumulative return after inflation (stock return 8% yearly, bond return 4.5% yearly, inflation 3% yearly)
80% stock / 20% bond	52%
70% stock / 30% bond	47%
60% stock / 40% bond	42%
50% stock / 50% bond	38%
40% stock / 60% bond	33%
30% stock / 70% bond	29%
20% stock / 80% bond	24%

The tables show why asset allocation is important. It determines an investor's future return, as well as the burden of a declining (bear) market that he or she will have to carry successfully to realize the returns.

== Problems with asset allocation ==
There are various reasons why asset allocation fails to work.

- Investor behavior is inherently biased. Even though investor chooses an asset allocation, implementation is a challenge.
- Investors agree to asset allocation, but after some good returns, they decide that they really wanted more risk.
- Investors agree to asset allocation, but after some bad returns, they decide that they really wanted less risk.
- Investors' risk tolerance is not knowable ahead of time.
- Security selection within asset classes will not necessarily produce a risk profile equal to the asset class.
- The long-run behavior of asset classes does not guarantee their shorter-term behavior.
- Different assets are subject to distinct tax treatments and regulatory considerations, which can make asset allocation decisions more complex.
- Frequent asset class rebalancing and maintaining a diversified portfolio can lead to substantial costs and fees, which may reduce overall returns.
- Accurately predicting the optimal times to invest in or sell out of various asset classes is difficult, and poor timing can adversely affect returns.

== See also ==
- Asset location
- Economic capital
- Efficient-market hypothesis
- Performance attribution
- Financial risk management § Investment management
