= Market neutral =

Financial investment strategy

An investment strategy or portfolio is considered market-neutral if it seeks to avoid some form of market risk entirely, typically by hedging. To evaluate market neutrality requires specifying the risk to avoid. For example, convertible arbitrage attempts to fully hedge fluctuations in the price of the underlying common stock. A portfolio is truly market-neutral if it exhibits zero correlation with the unwanted source of risk. Market neutrality is an ideal, which is rarely possible in practice. A portfolio that appears market-neutral may exhibit unexpected correlations as market conditions change. The risk of this occurring is called basis risk.

== Equity-market-neutral ==
Equity-market-neutral is a hedge fund strategy that seeks to exploit investment opportunities unique to some specific group of stocks while maintaining a neutral exposure to broad groups of stocks defined, for example, by sector, industry, market capitalization, country, or region.

The strategy holds long/short equity positions. Long positions are hedged with short positions in the same and related sectors so that the equity-market-neutral investor should be barely affected by sector-wide events. These positions, in essence, a bet that the long positions will outperform their sectors (or the short positions will underperform) regardless of the strength of the sectors. Equity-market-neutral strategy occupies a distinct place in the hedge fund landscape by exhibiting one of the lowest correlations with other alternative strategies.

Evaluating the Hedge Fund Research index returns for 28 different strategies from January 2005 to April 2009 showed that equity-market-neutral strategy had the second-lowest correlation with any of the other strategies, behind only short-bias funds which typically have a negative correlation with all other funds. This result is not surprising given that each fund utilizes the unique insights of a manager, and these insights are not replicated across funds.

== Examples of market-neutral strategies ==
- Delta neutral
- Pairs trade
