= Hedge fund =

Privately pooled investment fund using diverse strategies to seek high returns

A hedge fund is a pooled investment fund that holds liquid assets and that makes use of complex trading and risk management techniques to aim to improve investment performance and insulate returns from market risk. Among these portfolio techniques are short selling and the use of leverage and derivative instruments. In the United States, financial regulations require that hedge funds be marketed only to institutional investors and high-net-worth individuals.

Hedge funds are considered alternative investments. Their ability to use leverage and more complex investment techniques distinguishes them from regulated investment funds available to the retail market, commonly known as mutual funds and exchange-traded funds (ETFs). They are also considered distinct from private equity funds and other similar closed-end funds as hedge funds generally invest in relatively liquid assets and are usually open-ended. This means they typically allow investors to invest and withdraw capital periodically based on the fund's net asset value, whereas private-equity funds generally invest in illiquid assets and return capital only after a number of years. Other than a fund's regulatory status, there are no formal or fixed definitions of fund types, and so there are different views of what can constitute a "hedge fund".

Although hedge funds are not subject to the many restrictions applicable to regulated funds, regulations were passed in the United States and Europe following the 2008 financial crisis with the intention of increasing government oversight of hedge funds and eliminating certain regulatory gaps. While most modern hedge funds are able to employ a wide variety of financial instruments and risk management techniques, they can be very different from each other with respect to their strategies, risks, volatility and expected return profile. It is common for hedge fund investment strategies to aim to achieve a positive return on investment regardless of whether markets are rising or falling ("absolute return"). Hedge funds can be considered risky investments; the expected returns of some hedge fund strategies are less volatile than those of retail funds with high exposure to stock markets because of the use of hedging techniques. Research in 2015 showed that hedge fund activism can have significant real effects on target firms, including improvements in productivity and efficient reallocation of corporate assets. Moreover, these interventions often lead to increased labor productivity, although the benefits may not fully accrue to workers in terms of increased wages or work hours.

A hedge fund usually pays its investment manager a management fee (typically, 2% per annum of the net asset value of the fund) and a performance fee (typically, 20% of the increase in the fund's net asset value during a year). Hedge funds have existed for many decades and have become increasingly popular. They have now grown to be a substantial portion of the asset management industry, with assets totaling around $3.8 trillion as of 2021.

== Etymology ==
The word "hedge", meaning a line of bushes around the perimeter of a field, has long been used as a metaphor for placing limits on risk. Early hedge funds sought to hedge specific investments against general market fluctuations by shorting other, similar assets. Nowadays, however, many different investment strategies are used, many of which do not "hedge" risk.

== History ==
During the US bull market of the 1920s, there were numerous private investment vehicles available to wealthy investors. Of that period, the best known today is the Graham-Newman Partnership, founded by Benjamin Graham and his long-time business partner Jerry Newman. This was cited by Warren Buffett in a 2006 letter to the Museum of American Finance as an early hedge fund, and based on other comments from Buffett, Janet Tavakoli deems Graham's investment firm the first hedge fund.

The sociologist Alfred W. Jones is credited with coining the phrase "hedged fund" and is credited with creating the first hedge fund structure in 1949. Jones referred to his fund as being "hedged", a term then commonly used on Wall Street to describe the management of investment risk due to changes in the financial markets. Jones also developed the popular 2-and-20 structure of hedge funds, in which hedge funds charged investors a management fee of 2% on total assets and a 20% fee on realized gains.

In the 1970s, hedge funds specialized in a single strategy with most fund managers following the long/short equity model. Many hedge funds closed during the recession of 1969–1970 and the 1973–1974 stock market crash due to heavy losses. They received renewed attention in the late 1980s.

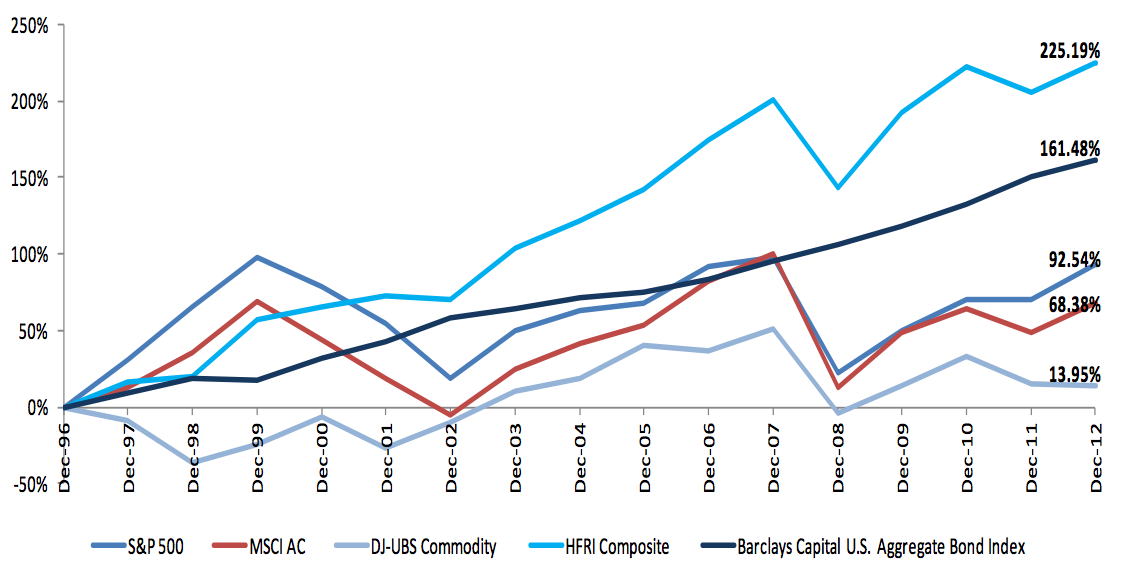
Cumulative hedge fund and other risk asset returns (1997–2012)

During the 1990s, the number of hedge funds increased significantly with the 1990s stock market rise, the aligned-interest compensation structure (i.e., common financial interests), and the promise of above average returns as likely causes. Over the next decade, hedge fund strategies expanded to include credit arbitrage, distressed debt, fixed income, quantitative, and multi-strategy. US institutional investors, such as pension and endowment funds, began allocating greater portions of their portfolios to hedge funds.

During the first decade of the 21st century, hedge funds gained popularity worldwide, and, by 2008, the worldwide hedge fund industry held an estimated US$1.93 trillion in assets under management (AUM). However, the 2008 financial crisis caused many hedge funds to restrict investor withdrawals and their popularity and AUM totals declined. AUM totals rebounded and in April 2011 were estimated at almost $2 trillion. As of February 2011, 61% of worldwide investment in hedge funds came from institutional sources.

In June 2011, the hedge fund management firms with the greatest AUM were Bridgewater Associates (US$58.9 billion), Man Group (US$39.2 billion), Paulson & Co. (US$35.1 billion), Brevan Howard (US$31 billion), and Och-Ziff (US$29.4 billion). Bridgewater Associates had $70 billion in assets under management as of March 2012. At the end of that year, the 241 largest hedge fund firms in the United States collectively held $1.335 trillion. In April 2012, the hedge fund industry reached a record high of US$2.13 trillion total assets under management. In the middle of the 2010s, the hedge fund industry experienced a general decline in the "old guard" fund managers. Dan Loeb called it a "hedge fund killing field" due to the classic long/short falling out of favor because of unprecedented easing by central banks. The US stock market correlation became untenable to short sellers. The hedge fund industry today has reached a state of maturity that is consolidating around the larger, more established firms such as Citadel, Elliot, Millennium, Bridgewater, and others. The rate of new fund start ups is now outpaced by fund closings.

In July 2017, hedge funds recorded their eighth consecutive monthly gain in returns with assets under management rising to a record $3.1 trillion.

== Strategies ==
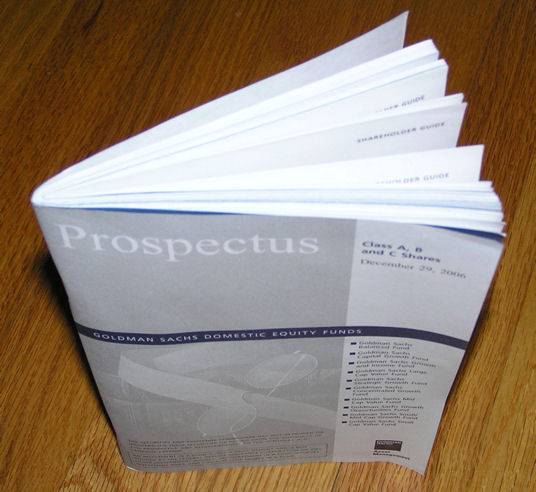
A prospectus from the US

Hedge fund strategies are generally classified among four major categories: global macro, directional, event-driven, and relative value (arbitrage). Strategies within these categories each entail characteristic risk and return profiles. A fund may employ a single strategy or multiple strategies for flexibility, risk management, or diversification. The hedge fund's prospectus, also known as an offering memorandum, offers potential investors information about key aspects of the fund, including the fund's investment strategy, investment type, and leverage limit.

The elements contributing to a hedge fund strategy include the hedge fund's approach to the market, the particular instrument use, the market sector the fund specializes in (e.g., healthcare), the method used to select investments, and the amount of diversification within the fund. There are a variety of market approaches to different asset classes, including equity, fixed income, commodity, and currency. Instruments used include equities, fixed income, futures, options, and swaps. Strategies can be divided into those in which investments can be selected by managers, known as "discretionary/qualitative", or those in which investments are selected using a computerized system, known as "systematic/quantitative". The amount of diversification within the fund can vary; funds may be multi-strategy, multi-fund, multi-market, multi-manager, or a combination.

Sometimes hedge fund strategies are described as "absolute return" and are classified as either "market neutral" or "directional". Market neutral funds have less correlation to overall market performance by "neutralizing" the effect of market swings whereas directional funds utilize trends and inconsistencies in the market and have greater exposure to the market's fluctuations.

=== Global macro ===
Hedge funds using a global macro investing strategy take large positions in share, bond, or currency markets in anticipation of global macroeconomic events in order to generate a risk-adjusted return. Global macro fund managers use macroeconomic ("big picture") analysis based on global market events and trends to identify opportunities for investment that would profit from anticipated price movements. While global macro strategies have a large amount of flexibility (due to their ability to use leverage to take large positions in diverse investments in multiple markets), the timing of the implementation of the strategies is important in order to generate attractive, risk-adjusted returns. Global macro is often categorized as a directional investment strategy.

Global macro strategies can be divided into discretionary and systematic approaches. Discretionary trading is carried out by investment managers who identify and select investments, whereas systematic trading is based on mathematical models and executed by software with limited human involvement beyond the programming and updating of the software. These strategies can also be divided into trend or counter-trend approaches depending on whether the fund attempts to profit from following market trend (long or short-term) or attempts to anticipate and profit from reversals in trends.

Within global macro strategies, there are further sub-strategies including "systematic diversified", in which the fund trades in diversified markets, or sector specialists such as "systematic currency", in which the fund trades in foreign exchange markets or any other sector specialisation. Other sub-strategies include those employed by commodity trading advisors (CTAs), where the fund trades in futures (or options) in commodity markets or in swaps. This is also known as a "managed future fund". CTAs trade in commodities (such as gold) and financial instruments, including stock indices. They also take both long and short positions, allowing them to make profit in both market upswings and downswings. Most global macro managers tends to be a CTA from a regulatory perspective and the main divide is between systematic and discretionary strategies. A classification framework for CTA/Macro Strategies can be found in the reference.

=== Directional ===
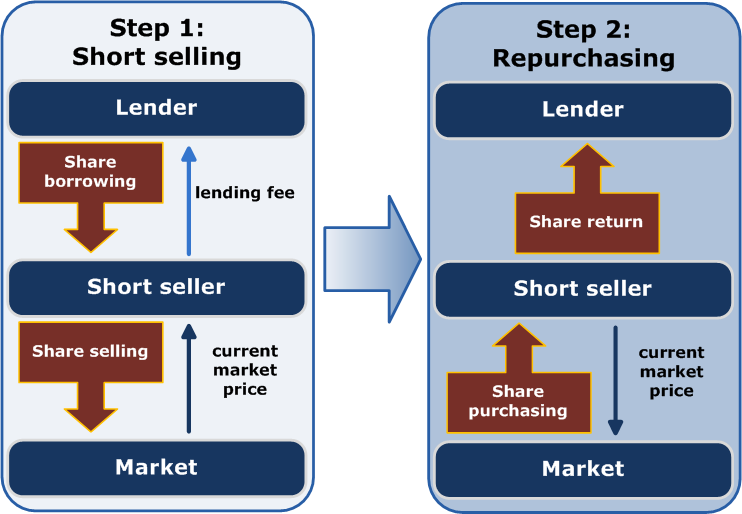
Schematic representation of short selling in two steps. The short seller borrows shares and immediately sells them. The short seller then expects the price to decrease, when the seller can profit by purchasing the shares to return to the lender.

Directional investment strategies use market movements, trends, or inconsistencies when picking stocks across a variety of markets. Computer models can be used, or fund managers will identify and select investments. These types of strategies have a greater exposure to the fluctuations of the overall market than do market neutral strategies. Directional hedge fund strategies include US and international long/short equity hedge funds, where long equity positions are hedged with short sales of equities or equity index options.

Within directional strategies, there are a number of sub-strategies. "Emerging markets" funds focus on emerging markets such as China and India, whereas "sector funds" specialize in specific areas including technology, healthcare, biotechnology, pharmaceuticals, energy, and basic materials. Funds using a "fundamental growth" strategy invest in companies with more earnings growth than the overall stock market or relevant sector, while funds using a "fundamental value" strategy invest in undervalued companies. Funds that use quantitative and financial signal processing techniques for equity trading are described as using a "quantitative directional" strategy. Funds using a "short bias" strategy take advantage of declining equity prices using short positions.

=== Event-driven ===
Event-driven strategies concern situations in which the underlying investment opportunity and risk are associated with an event. An event-driven investment strategy finds investment opportunities in corporate transactional events such as consolidations, acquisitions, recapitalizations, bankruptcies, and liquidations. Managers employing such a strategy capitalize on valuation inconsistencies in the market before or after such events, and take a position based on the predicted movement of the security or securities in question. Large institutional investors such as hedge funds are more likely to pursue event-driven investing strategies than traditional equity investors because they have the expertise and resources to analyze corporate transactional events for investment opportunities.

Corporate transactional events generally fit into three categories: distressed securities, risk arbitrage, and special situations. Distressed securities include such events as restructurings, recapitalizations, and bankruptcies. A distressed securities investment strategy involves investing in the bonds or loans of companies facing bankruptcy or severe financial distress, when these bonds or loans are being traded at a discount to their value. Hedge fund managers pursuing the distressed debt investment strategy aim to capitalize on depressed bond prices. Hedge funds purchasing distressed debt may prevent those companies from going bankrupt, as such an acquisition deters foreclosure by banks. While event-driven investing, in general, tends to thrive during a bull market, distressed investing works best during a bear market.

Risk arbitrage or merger arbitrage includes such events as mergers, acquisitions, liquidations, and hostile takeovers. Risk arbitrage typically involves buying and selling the stocks of two or more merging companies to take advantage of market discrepancies between acquisition price and stock price. The risk element arises from the possibility that the merger or acquisition will not go ahead as planned; hedge fund managers will use research and analysis to determine if the event will take place.

Special situations are events that impact the value of a company's stock, including the restructuring of a company or corporate transactions including spin-offs, share buy backs, security issuance/repurchase, asset sales, or other catalyst-oriented situations. To take advantage of special situations the hedge fund manager must identify an upcoming event that will increase or decrease the value of the company's equity and equity-related instruments.

Other event-driven strategies include credit arbitrage strategies, which focus on corporate fixed income securities; an activist strategy, where the fund takes large positions in companies and uses the ownership to participate in the management; a strategy based on predicting the final approval of new pharmaceutical drugs; and legal catalyst strategy, which specializes in companies involved in major lawsuits.

=== Relative value ===
Relative value arbitrage strategies take advantage of relative discrepancies in price between securities. The price discrepancy can occur due to mispricing of securities compared to related securities, the underlying security or the market overall. Hedge fund managers can use various types of analysis to identify price discrepancies in securities, including mathematical, technical, or fundamental techniques. Relative value is often used as a synonym for market neutral, as strategies in this category typically have very little or no directional market exposure to the market as a whole. Other relative value sub-strategies include:

- Fixed income arbitrage: exploit pricing inefficiencies between related fixed income securities.
- Equity market neutral: exploit differences in stock prices by being long and short in stocks within the same sector, industry, market capitalization, country, which also creates a hedge against broader market factors.
- Convertible arbitrage: exploit pricing inefficiencies between convertible securities and the corresponding stocks.
- Asset-backed securities (fixed-income asset-backed): fixed income arbitrage strategy using asset-backed securities.
- Credit long/short: the same as long/short equity, but in credit markets instead of equity markets.
- Statistical arbitrage: identifying pricing inefficiencies between securities through mathematical modelling techniques.
- Volatility arbitrage: exploit the change in volatility, instead of the change in price.
- Yield alternatives: non-fixed income arbitrage strategies based on the yield, instead of the price.
- Regulatory arbitrage: exploit regulatory differences between two or more markets.
- Risk arbitrage: exploit market discrepancies between acquisition price and stock price.
- Value investing: buying securities that appear underpriced by some form of fundamental analysis.

=== Miscellaneous ===
In addition to those strategies within the four main categories, there are several strategies that do not entirely fit into these categories.

- Fund of hedge funds (multi-manager): a hedge fund with a diversified portfolio of numerous underlying single-manager hedge funds.
- Multi-manager: a hedge fund wherein the investment is spread along separate sub-managers investing in their own strategy.
- Multi-strategy: a hedge fund using a combination of different strategies.
- 130-30 funds: equity funds with 130% long and 30% short positions, leaving a net long position of 100%.
- Risk parity: equalizing risk by allocating funds to a wide range of categories while maximizing gains through financial leveraging.
- AI-driven: using sophisticated machine learning models and sometimes big data.

== Risk ==
For an investor who already holds large quantities of equities and bonds, investment in hedge funds may provide diversification and reduce the overall portfolio risk. Managers of hedge funds often aim to produce returns that are relatively uncorrelated with market indices and are consistent with investors' desired level of risk. While hedging can reduce some risks of an investment it usually increases others, such as operational risk and model risk, so overall risk is reduced but cannot be eliminated. According to a report by the Hennessee Group, hedge funds were approximately one-third less volatile than the S&P 500 between 1993 and 2010.

=== Risk management ===
Investors in hedge funds are, in most countries, required to be qualified investors who are assumed to be aware of the investment risks, and accept these risks because of the potential returns relative to those risks. Fund managers may employ extensive risk management strategies in order to protect the fund and investors. According to the Financial Times, "big hedge funds have some of the most sophisticated and exacting risk management practices anywhere in asset management." Hedge fund managers that hold a large number of investment positions for short periods are likely to have a particularly comprehensive risk management system in place, and it has become usual for funds to have independent risk officers who assess and manage risks but are not otherwise involved in trading.

A variety of different measurement techniques and models are used to estimate risk according to the fund's leverage, liquidity, and investment strategy. Non-normality of returns, volatility clustering and trends are not always accounted for by conventional risk measurement methodologies and so in addition to value at risk and similar measurements, funds may use integrated measures such as drawdowns. See Financial risk management § Investment management generally.

In addition to assessing the market-related risks that may arise from an investment, investors commonly employ operational due diligence to assess the risk that error or fraud at a hedge fund might result in a loss to the investor. Considerations will include the organization and management of operations at the hedge fund manager, whether the investment strategy is likely to be sustainable, and the fund's ability to develop as a company.

=== Transparency, and regulatory considerations ===
Since hedge funds are private entities and have few public disclosure requirements, this is sometimes perceived as a lack of transparency. Another common perception of hedge funds is that their managers are not subject to as much regulatory oversight and/or registration requirements as other financial investment managers, and more prone to manager-specific idiosyncratic risks such as style drifts, faulty operations, or fraud. New regulations introduced in the US and the EU as of 2010 required hedge fund managers to report more information, leading to greater transparency. In addition, investors, particularly institutional investors, are encouraging further developments in hedge fund risk management, both through internal practices and external regulatory requirements. The increasing influence of institutional investors has led to greater transparency: hedge funds increasingly provide information to investors including valuation methodology, positions, and leverage exposure.

==== Data and research ====
Institutional investors and asset managers utilize third-party data and analytics platforms, such as Preqin, BarclayHedge, and Hedge Fund Research (HFR), to track fund performance, investor allocations, fee structures, and industry benchmarks.

=== Risks shared with other investment types ===
Hedge funds share many of the same types of risk as other investment classes, including liquidity risk and manager risk. Liquidity refers to the degree to which an asset can be bought and sold or converted to cash; similar to private-equity funds, hedge funds employ a lock-up period during which an investor cannot remove money. Manager risk refers to those risks which arise from the management of funds. As well as specific risks such as style drift, which refers to a fund manager "drifting" away from an area of specific expertise, manager risk factors include valuation risk, capacity risk, concentration risk, and leverage risk. Valuation risk refers to the concern that the net asset value (NAV) of investments may be inaccurate; capacity risk can arise from placing too much money into one particular strategy, which may lead to fund performance deterioration; and concentration risk may arise if a fund has too much exposure to a particular investment, sector, trading strategy, or group of correlated funds. These risks may be managed through defined controls over conflict of interest, restrictions on allocation of funds, and set exposure limits for strategies.

Many investment funds use leverage, the practice of borrowing money, trading on margin, or using derivatives to obtain market exposure in excess of that provided by investors' capital. Although leverage can increase potential returns, the opportunity for larger gains is weighed against the possibility of greater losses. Hedge funds employing leverage are likely to engage in extensive risk management practices. In comparison with investment banks, hedge fund leverage is relatively low; according to a National Bureau of Economic Research working paper, the average leverage for investment banks is 14.2, compared to between 1.5 and 2.5 for hedge funds.

Some types of funds, including hedge funds, are perceived as having a greater appetite for risk, with the intention of maximizing returns, subject to the risk tolerance of investors and the fund manager. Managers will have an additional incentive to increase risk oversight when their own capital is invested in the fund.

== Fees and remuneration ==
=== Fees paid to hedge funds ===
Hedge fund management firms typically charge their funds both a management fee and a performance fee.

Management fees are calculated as a percentage of the fund's net asset value and typically range from 1% to 4% per annum, with 2% being standard. They are usually expressed as an annual percentage, but calculated and paid monthly or quarterly. Management fees for hedge funds are designed to cover the operating costs of the manager, whereas the performance fee provides the manager's profits. However, due to economies of scale the management fee from larger funds can generate a significant part of a manager's profits, and as a result some fees have been criticized by some public pension funds, such as CalPERS, for being too high.

The performance fee is typically 20% of the fund's profits during any year, though performance fees range between 10% and 50%. Performance fees are intended to provide an incentive for a manager to generate profits. Performance fees have been criticized by Warren Buffett, who believes that because hedge funds share only the profits and not the losses, such fees create an incentive for high-risk investment management. Performance fee rates have fallen since the start of the credit crunch.

Almost all hedge fund performance fees include a "high water mark" (or "loss carryforward provision"), which means that the performance fee only applies to net profits (i.e., profits after losses in previous years have been recovered). This prevents managers from receiving fees for volatile performance, though a manager will sometimes close a fund that has suffered serious losses and start a new fund, rather than attempt to recover the losses over a number of years without a performance fee.

Some performance fees include a "hurdle", so that a fee is only paid on the fund's performance in excess of a benchmark rate (e.g., LIBOR) or a fixed percentage. The hurdle is usually tied to a benchmark rate such as Libor or the one-year Treasury bill rate plus a spread. A "soft" hurdle means the performance fee is calculated on all the fund's returns if the hurdle rate is cleared. A "hard" hurdle is calculated only on returns above the hurdle rate. By example the manager sets a hurdle rate equal to 5%, and the fund return 15%, incentive fees would only apply to the 10% above the hurdle rate. A hurdle is intended to ensure that a manager is only rewarded if the fund generates returns in excess of the returns that the investor would have received if they had invested their money elsewhere.

Some hedge funds charge a redemption fee (or withdrawal fee) for early withdrawals during a specified period of time (typically a year), or when withdrawals exceed a predetermined percentage of the original investment. The purpose of the fee is to discourage short-term investing, reduce turnover, and deter withdrawals after periods of poor performance. Unlike management fees and performance fees, redemption fees are usually kept by the fund and redistributed to all investors.

=== Remuneration of portfolio managers ===
Hedge fund management firms are often owned by their portfolio managers, who are therefore entitled to any profits that the business makes. As management fees are intended to cover the firm's operating costs, performance fees (and any excess management fees) are generally distributed to the firm's owners as profits. Funds do not tend to report compensation, and so published lists of the amounts earned by top managers tend to be estimates based on factors such as the fees charged by their funds and the capital they are thought to have invested in them. Many managers have accumulated large stakes in their own funds and so top hedge fund managers can earn extraordinary amounts of money, perhaps up to $4 billion in a good year.

Earnings at the very top are higher than in any other sector of the financial industry, and collectively the top 25 hedge fund managers regularly earn more than all 500 of the chief executives in the S&P 500. Most hedge fund managers are remunerated much less, however, and if performance fees are not earned then small managers at least are unlikely to be paid significant amounts.

In 2011, the top manager earned $3 billion, the tenth earned $210 million, and the 30th earned $80 million. In 2011, the average earnings for the 25 highest-compensated hedge fund managers in the United States was $576 million while the mean total compensation for all hedge fund investment professionals was $690,786 and the median was $312,329. The same figures for hedge fund CEOs were $1,037,151 and $600,000, and for chief investment officers were $1,039,974 and $300,000, respectively.

Of the 1,226 people on the Forbes World's Billionaires List for 2012, 36 of the financiers listed "derived significant chunks" of their wealth from hedge fund management. Among the richest 1,000 people in the United Kingdom, 54 were hedge fund managers, according to the Sunday Times Rich List for 2012.

A portfolio manager risks losing his past compensation if he or she engages in insider trading. In Morgan Stanley v. Skowron, 989 F. Supp. 2d 356 (S.D.N.Y. 2013), applying New York's faithless servant doctrine, the court held that a hedge fund's portfolio manager engaging in insider trading in violation of his company's code of conduct, which also required him to report his misconduct, must repay his employer the full $31 million his employer paid him as compensation during his period of faithlessness. The court called the insider trading the "ultimate abuse of a portfolio manager's position". The judge also wrote: "In addition to exposing Morgan Stanley to government investigations and direct financial losses, Skowron's behavior damaged the firm's reputation, a valuable corporate asset."

== Structure ==
A hedge fund is an investment vehicle that is most often structured as an offshore corporation, limited partnership, or limited liability company. The fund is managed by an investment manager in the form of an organization or company that is legally and financially distinct from the hedge fund and its portfolio of assets. Many investment managers utilize service providers for operational support. Service providers include prime brokers, banks, administrators, distributors, and accounting firms.

=== Prime broker ===
Prime brokers clear trades and provide leverage and short-term financing. They are usually divisions of large investment banks. The prime broker acts as a counterparty to derivative contracts, and lends securities for particular investment strategies, such as long/short equities and convertible bond arbitrage. It can provide custodial services for the fund's assets, and trade execution and clearing services for the hedge fund manager.

=== Administrator ===
Hedge fund administrators are typically responsible for valuation services, and often operations, and accounting.

Calculation of the net asset value ("NAV") by the administrator, including the pricing of securities at current market value and calculation of the fund's income and expense accruals, is a core administrator task, because it is the price at which investors buy and sell shares in the fund. The accurate and timely calculation of NAV by the administrator is vital. The case of Anwar v. Fairfield Greenwich (SDNY 2015) is the major case relating to fund administrator liability for failure to handle its NAV-related obligations properly. There, the hedge fund administrator and other defendants settled in 2016 by paying the Anwar investor plaintiffs $235 million.

Administrator back office support allows fund managers to concentrate on trades. Administrators also process subscriptions and redemptions and perform various shareholder services. Hedge funds in the United States are not required to appoint an administrator and all of these functions can be performed by an investment manager. A number of conflict of interest situations may arise in this arrangement, particularly in the calculation of a fund's net asset value. Most funds employ external auditors, thereby arguably offering a greater degree of transparency.

=== Auditor ===
An auditor is an independent accounting firm used to perform a complete audit the fund's financial statements. The year-end audit is performed in accordance with the standard accounting practices enforced within the country in which the fund it established, typically US GAAP or the International Financial Reporting Standards (IFRS). The auditor may verify the fund's NAV and assets under management (AUM). Some auditors only provide "NAV lite" services, meaning that the valuation is based on prices received from the manager rather than an independent assessment.

=== Distributor ===
A distributor is an underwriter, broker, dealer, or other intermediary who participates in the distribution of securities. The distributor is typically also responsible for marketing the fund to potential investors.

Many hedge funds do not employ dedicated distributors; in such cases, the investment manager assumes responsibility for both the distribution of securities and marketing activities. However, many funds also engage placement agents and broker-dealers to assist with distribution and investor marketing.

=== Domicile and taxation ===
The legal structure of a specific hedge fund, in particular its domicile and the type of legal entity in use, is usually determined by the tax expectations of the fund's investors. Regulatory considerations will also play a role. Many hedge funds are established in offshore financial centers to avoid adverse tax consequences for its foreign and tax-exempt investors. Offshore funds that invest in the US typically pay withholding taxes on certain types of investment income, but not US capital gains tax. However, the fund's investors are subject to tax in their own jurisdictions on any increase in the value of their investments. This tax treatment promotes cross-border investments by limiting the potential for multiple jurisdictions to layer taxes on investors.

US tax-exempt investors (such as pension plans and endowments) invest primarily in offshore hedge funds to preserve their tax exempt status and avoid unrelated business taxable income. The investment manager, usually based in a major financial center, pays tax on its management fees per the tax laws of the state and country where it is located. In 2011, half of the existing hedge funds were registered offshore and half onshore. The Cayman Islands was the leading location for offshore funds, accounting for 34% of the total number of global hedge funds. The US had 24%, Luxembourg 10%, Ireland 7%, the British Virgin Islands 6%, and Bermuda had 3%.

Hedge funds take advantage of a tax loopole called carried interest to get around paying too much in taxes by fancy legalistic maneouvres on their part.

=== Basket options ===
Deutsche Bank and Barclays created special options accounts for hedge fund clients in the banks' names and claimed to own the assets, when in fact the hedge fund clients had full control of the assets and reaped the profits. The hedge funds would then execute trades – many of them a few seconds in duration – but wait until just after a year had passed to exercise the options, allowing them to report the profits at a lower long-term capital gains tax rate.

— Alexandra Stevenson. July 8, 2015. The New York Times

The US Senate Permanent Subcommittee on Investigations chaired by Carl Levin issued a 2014 report that found that from 1998 and 2013, hedge funds avoided billions of dollars in taxes by using basket options. The Internal Revenue Service began investigating Renaissance Technologies in 2009, and Levin criticized the IRS for taking six years to investigate the company. Using basket options Renaissance avoided "more than $6 billion in taxes over more than a decade".

These banks and hedge funds involved in this case used dubious structured financial products in a giant game of 'let's pretend,' costing the Treasury billions and bypassing safeguards that protect the economy from excessive bank lending for stock speculation.

— Carl Levin. 2015. Senate Permanent Subcommittee on Investigations

A dozen other hedge funds along with Renaissance Technologies used Deutsche Bank's and Barclays' basket options. Renaissance argued that basket options were "extremely important because they gave the hedge fund the ability to increase its returns by borrowing more and to protect against model and programming failures". In July 2015, the United States Internal Revenue claimed hedge funds used basket options "to bypass taxes on short-term trades". These basket options will now be labeled as listed transactions that must be declared on tax returns, and a failure to do would result in a penalty.

=== Investment manager locations ===
In contrast to the funds themselves, investment managers are primarily located onshore. The United States remains the largest center of investment with US-based funds managing around 70% of global assets at the end of 2011. As of April 2012, there were approximately 3,990 investment advisers managing one or more private hedge funds registered with the Securities and Exchange Commission. New York City and the Gold Coast area of Connecticut are the leading locations for US hedge fund managers.

London was Europe's leading center for hedge fund managers, but since the Brexit referendum some formerly London-based hedge funds have relocated to other European financial centers such as Frankfurt, Luxembourg, Paris, and Dublin, while some other hedge funds have moved their European offices back to New York City. Before Brexit, according to EuroHedge data, around 800 funds located in the UK had managed 85% of European-based hedge fund assets in 2011. Interest in hedge funds in Asia has increased significantly since 2003, especially in Japan, Hong Kong, and Singapore. After Brexit, Europe and the US remain the leading locations for the management of Asian hedge fund assets.

=== Legal entity ===
Hedge fund legal structures vary depending on location and the investor(s). US hedge funds aimed at US-based, taxable investors are generally structured as limited partnerships or limited liability companies. Limited partnerships and other flow-through taxation structures assure that investors in hedge funds are not subject to both entity-level and personal-level taxation. A hedge fund structured as a limited partnership must have a general partner. The general partner may be an individual or a corporation. The general partner serves as the manager of the limited partnership, and has unlimited liability. The limited partners serve as the fund's investors, and have no responsibility for management or investment decisions. Their liability is limited to the amount of money they invest for partnership interests. As an alternative to a limited partnership arrangement, U.S. domestic hedge funds may be structured as limited liability companies, with members acting as corporate shareholders and enjoying protection from individual liability.

By contrast, offshore corporate funds are usually used for non-US investors, and when they are domiciled in an applicable offshore tax haven, no entity-level tax is imposed. Many managers of offshore funds permit the participation of tax-exempt US investors, such as pensions funds, institutional endowments, and charitable trusts. As an alternative legal structure, offshore funds may be formed as an open-ended unit trust using an unincorporated mutual fund structure. Japanese investors prefer to invest in unit trusts, such as those available in the Cayman Islands.

The investment manager who organizes the hedge fund may retain an interest in the fund, either as the general partner of a limited partnership or as the holder of "founder shares" in a corporate fund. For offshore funds structured as corporate entities, the fund may appoint a board of directors. The board's primary role is to provide a layer of oversight while representing the interests of the shareholders. However, in practice board members may lack sufficient expertise to be effective in performing those duties. The board may include both affiliated directors who are employees of the fund and independent directors whose relationship to the fund is limited.

=== Types of funds ===
- Open-ended hedge funds continue to issue shares to new investors and allow periodic withdrawals at the net asset value ("NAV") for each share.
- Closed-ended hedge funds issue a limited number of tradeable shares at inception.
- Shares of Listed hedges funds are traded on stock exchanges, such as the Irish Stock Exchange, and may be purchased by non-accredited investors.

=== Side pockets ===
A side pocket is a mechanism whereby a fund compartmentalizes assets that are relatively illiquid or difficult to value reliably. When an investment is side-pocketed, its value is calculated separately from the value of the fund's main portfolio. Because side pockets are used to hold illiquid investments, investors do not have the standard redemption rights with respect to the side pocket investment that they do with respect to the fund's main portfolio. Profits or losses from the investment are allocated on a pro rata basis only to those who are investors at the time the investment is placed into the side pocket and are not shared with new investors. Funds typically carry side pocket assets "at cost" for purposes of calculating management fees and reporting net asset values. This allows fund managers to avoid attempting a valuation of the underlying investments, which may not always have a readily available market value.

Side pockets were widely used by hedge funds during the 2008 financial crisis amidst a flood of withdrawal requests. Side pockets allowed fund managers to lay away illiquid securities until market liquidity improved, a move that could reduce losses. However, as the practice restricts investors' ability to redeem their investments it is often unpopular and many have alleged that it has been abused or applied unfairly. The SEC also has expressed concern about aggressive use of side pockets and has sanctioned certain fund managers for inappropriate use of them.

== Regulation ==
Hedge funds must abide by the national, federal, and state regulatory laws in their respective locations. The U.S. regulations and restrictions that apply to hedge funds differ from those that apply to its mutual funds. Mutual funds, unlike hedge funds and other private funds, are subject to the Investment Company Act of 1940, which is a highly detailed and extensive regulatory regime. According to a report by the International Organization of Securities Commissions, the most common form of regulation pertains to restrictions on financial advisers and hedge fund managers in an effort to minimize client fraud. On the other hand, U.S. hedge funds are exempt from many of the standard registration and reporting requirements because they only accept accredited investors. In 2010, regulations were enacted in the US and European Union which introduced additional hedge fund reporting requirements. These included the U.S.'s Dodd-Frank Wall Street Reform Act and European Alternative Investment Fund Managers Directive.

In 2007, in an effort to engage in self-regulation, 14 leading hedge fund managers developed a voluntary set of international standards in best practice and known as the Hedge Fund Standards they were designed to create a "framework of transparency, integrity and good governance" in the hedge fund industry. The Hedge Fund Standards Board was set up to prompt and maintain these standards going forward, and by 2016 it had approximately 200 hedge fund managers and institutional investors with a value of US$3tn investment endorsing the standards. The Managed Funds Association is a US-based trade association, while the Alternative Investment Management Association is the primarily European counterpart.

=== United States ===
Hedge funds within the US are subject to regulatory, reporting, and record-keeping requirements. Many hedge funds also fall under the jurisdiction of the Commodity Futures Trading Commission, and are subject to rules and provisions of the 1922 Commodity Exchange Act, which prohibits fraud and manipulation. The Securities Act of 1933 required companies to file a registration statement with the SEC to comply with its private placement rules before offering their securities to the public, and most traditional hedge funds in the United States are offered effectively as private placement offerings. The Securities Exchange Act of 1934 required a fund with more than 499 investors to register with the SEC. The Investment Advisers Act of 1940 contained anti-fraud provisions that regulated hedge fund managers and advisers, created limits for the number and types of investors, and prohibited public offerings. The Act also exempted hedge funds from mandatory registration with the SEC when selling to Qualified Purchasers with a minimum of US$5 million in investment assets. Companies and institutional investors with at least US$25 million in investment assets also qualified.

In December 2004, the SEC began requiring hedge fund advisers, managing more than US$25 million and with more than 14 investors, to register with the SEC under the Investment Advisers Act. The SEC stated that it was adopting a "risk-based approach" to monitoring hedge funds as part of its evolving regulatory regime for the burgeoning industry. The new rule was controversial, with two Commissioners dissenting, and was later challenged in court by a hedge fund manager. In June 2006, the U.S. Court of Appeals for the District of Columbia overturned the rule and sent it back to the agency to be reviewed. In response to the court decision, in 2007 the SEC adopted Rule 206(4)-8, which unlike the earlier-challenged rule, "does not impose additional filing, reporting or disclosure obligations" but does potentially increase "the risk of enforcement action" for negligent or fraudulent activity. Hedge fund managers with at least US$100 million in assets under management are required to file publicly quarterly reports disclosing ownership of registered equity securities and are subject to public disclosure if they own more than 5% of the class of any registered equity security. Registered advisers must report their business practices and disciplinary history to the SEC and to their investors. They are required to have written compliance policies, a chief compliance officer, and their records and practices may be examined by the SEC.

The U.S.'s Dodd-Frank Wall Street Reform Act was passed in July 2010 and requires SEC registration of advisers who manage private funds with more than US$150 million in assets. Registered managers must file Form ADV with the SEC, as well as information regarding their assets under management and trading positions. Previously, advisers with fewer than 15 clients were exempt, although many hedge fund advisers voluntarily registered with the SEC to satisfy institutional investors. Under Dodd-Frank, investment advisers with less than US$100 million in assets under management became subject to state regulation. This increased the number of hedge funds under state supervision. Overseas advisers who managed more than US$25 million were also required to register with the SEC. The Act requires hedge funds to provide information about their trades and portfolios to regulators including the newly created Financial Stability Oversight Council. In this regard, most hedge funds and other private funds, including private-equity funds, must file Form PF with the SEC, which is an extensive reporting form with substantial data on the funds' activities and positions. Under the "Volcker Rule", regulators are also required to implement regulations for banks, their affiliates, and holding companies to limit their relationships with hedge funds and to prohibit these organizations from proprietary trading, and to limit their investment in, and sponsorship of, hedge funds.

=== Europe ===
Within the European Union (EU), hedge funds are primarily regulated through their managers. In the United Kingdom, where 80% of Europe's hedge funds are based, hedge fund managers are required to be authorised and regulated by the Financial Conduct Authority (FCA). Each country has its own specific restrictions on hedge fund activities, including controls on use of derivatives in Portugal, and limits on leverage in France.

In the EU, managers are subject to the EU's Directive on Alternative Investment Fund Managers (AIFMD). According to the EU, the aim of the directive is to provide greater monitoring and control of alternative investment funds. AIFMD requires all EU hedge fund managers to register with national regulatory authorities and to disclose more information, on a more frequent basis. It also directs hedge fund managers to hold larger amounts of capital. AIFMD also introduced a "passport" for hedge funds authorised in one EU country to operate throughout the EU. The scope of AIFMD is broad and encompasses managers located within the EU as well as non-EU managers that market their funds to European investors. An aspect of AIFMD which challenges established practices in the hedge funds sector is the potential restriction of remuneration through bonus deferrals and clawback provisions.

=== Offshore ===
Some hedge funds are established in offshore centres, such as the Cayman Islands, Dublin, Luxembourg, Singapore the British Virgin Islands, and Bermuda, which have different regulations concerning non-accredited investors, client confidentiality, and fund manager independence.

=== South Africa ===
In South Africa, investment fund managers must be approved by, and register with, the Financial Services Board (FSB).

== Performance ==
=== Measurement ===
Performance statistics for individual hedge funds are difficult to obtain, as the funds have historically not been required to report their performance to a central repository, and restrictions against public offerings and advertisement have led many managers to refuse to provide performance information publicly. However, summaries of individual hedge fund performance are occasionally available in industry journals and databases.

One estimate is that the average hedge fund returned 11.4% per year, representing a 6.7% return above overall market performance before fees, based on performance data from 8,400 hedge funds. Another estimate is that between January 2000 and December 2009 hedge funds outperformed other investments and were substantially less volatile, with stocks falling an average of 2.62% per year over the decade and hedge funds rising an average of 6.54% per year; this was an unusually volatile period with both the 2001-2002 dot-com bubble and a recession beginning mid 2007. However, more recent data show that hedge fund performance declined and underperformed the market from about 2009 to 2016.

Hedge funds performance is measured by comparing their returns to an estimate of their risk. Common measures are the Sharpe ratio, Treynor measure and Jensen's alpha. These measures work best when returns follow normal distributions without autocorrelation, and these assumptions are often not met in practice.

New performance measures have been introduced that attempt to address some of theoretical concerns with traditional indicators, including: modified Sharpe ratios; the Omega ratio introduced by Keating and Shadwick in 2002; Alternative Investments Risk Adjusted Performance (AIRAP) published by Sharma in 2004; and Kappa developed by Kaplan and Knowles in 2004.

=== Sector-size effect ===
There is a debate over whether alpha (the manager's skill element in performance) has been diluted by the expansion of the hedge fund industry. Two reasons are given. First, the increase in traded volume may have been reducing the market anomalies that are a source of hedge fund performance. Second, the remuneration model is attracting more managers, which may dilute the talent available in the industry.

=== Hedge fund indices ===
Indices play a central and unambiguous role in traditional asset markets, where they are widely accepted as representative of their underlying portfolios. Equity and debt index fund products provide investable access to most developed markets in these asset classes.

Hedge fund indices are more problematic. The typical hedge fund is not traded on exchange, will accept investments only at the discretion of the manager, and does not have an obligation to publish returns. Despite these challenges, Non-investable, Investable, and Clone indices have been developed.

==== Non-investable indices ====
Non-investable indices are indicative in nature and aim to represent the performance of some database of hedge funds using some measure such as mean, median, or weighted mean from a hedge fund database. The databases have diverse selection criteria and methods of construction, and no single database captures all funds. This leads to significant differences in reported performance between different indices.

Although they aim to be representative, non-investable indices suffer from a lengthy and largely unavoidable list of biases. Funds' participation in a database is voluntary, leading to self-selection bias because those funds that choose to report may not be typical of funds as a whole. For example, some do not report because of poor results or because they have already reached their target size and do not wish to raise further money.

The short lifetimes of many hedge funds mean that there are many new entrants and many departures each year, which raises the problem of survivorship bias. If we examine only funds that have survived to the present, we will overestimate past returns because many of the worst-performing funds have not survived, and the observed association between fund youth and fund performance suggests that this bias may be substantial.

When a fund is added to a database for the first time, all or part of its historical data is recorded ex-post in the database. It is likely that funds only publish their results when they are favorable, so that the average performances displayed by the funds during their incubation period are inflated. This is known as "instant history bias" or "backfill bias".

==== Investable indices ====
Investable indices are an attempt to reduce these problems by ensuring that the return of the index is available to shareholders. To create an investable index, the index provider selects funds and develops structured products or derivative instruments that deliver the performance of the index. When investors buy these products the index provider makes the investments in the underlying funds, making an investable index similar in some ways to a fund of hedge funds portfolio.

To make the index investable, hedge funds must agree to accept investments on the terms given by the constructor. To make the index liquid, these terms must include provisions for redemptions that some managers may consider too onerous to be acceptable. This means that investable indices do not represent the total universe of hedge funds. Most seriously, they under-represent more successful managers, who typically refuse to accept such investment protocols.

==== Hedge fund replication ====
The most recent addition to the field approaches the problem in a different manner. Instead of reflecting the performance of actual hedge funds, they take a statistical approach to the analysis of historic hedge fund returns and use this to construct a model of how hedge fund returns respond to the movements of various investable financial assets. This model is then used to construct an investable portfolio of those assets. This makes the index investable, and in principle, they can be as representative as the hedge fund database from which they were constructed. However, these clone indices rely on a statistical modelling process. Such indices have too short a history to state whether this approach will be considered successful.

=== Closures ===
In March 2017, HFR – a hedge fund research data and service provider – reported that there were more hedge-fund closures in 2016 than during the 2009 recession. According to the report, several large public pension funds pulled their investments in hedge funds, because the funds' subpar performance as a group did not merit the high fees they charged.

Despite the hedge fund industry topping $3 trillion for the first time ever in 2016, the number of new hedge funds launched fell short of levels before the 2008 financial crisis. There were 729 hedge fund launches in 2016, fewer than the 784 opened in 2009, and dramatically fewer than the 968 launches in 2015.

== Debates and controversies ==
=== Systemic risk ===
Systemic risk refers to the risk of instability across the entire financial system, as opposed to within a single company. Such risk may arise following a destabilizing event or events affecting a group of financial institutions linked through investment activity. Organizations such as the European Central Bank have charged that hedge funds pose systemic risks to the financial sector, and following the failure of hedge fund Long-Term Capital Management (LTCM) in 1998 there was widespread concern about the potential for systemic risk if a hedge fund failure led to the failure of its counterparties. (As it happens, no financial assistance was provided to LTCM by the US Federal Reserve, so there was no direct cost to US taxpayers, but a large bailout had to be mounted by a number of financial institutions.)

However, these claims are widely disputed by the financial industry, who typically regard hedge funds as "small enough to fail", since most are relatively small in terms of the assets they manage and operate with low leverage, thereby limiting the potential harm to the economic system should one of them fail. Formal analysis of hedge fund leverage before and during the 2008 financial crisis suggests that hedge fund leverage is both fairly modest and counter-cyclical to the market leverage of investment banks and the larger financial sector. Hedge fund leverage decreased prior to the 2008 financial crisis, even while the leverage of other financial intermediaries continued to increase. Hedge funds fail regularly, and numerous hedge funds failed during the 2008 financial crisis. In testimony to the US House Financial Services Committee in 2009, Ben Bernanke, the Federal Reserve Board Chairman said he "would not think that any hedge fund or private-equity fund would become a systemically critical firm individually".

This does leave the possibility that hedge funds collectively might contribute to systemic risk if they exhibit herd or self-coordinating behavior, perhaps because many hedge funds make losses in similar trades. This coupled with the extensive use of leverage could lead to forced liquidations in a crisis.

Hedge funds are also closely connected to their prime brokers, typically investment banks, which could contribute to their instability in a crisis, though this works both ways and failing counterparty banks can freeze hedge funds assets, as Lehman Brothers did in 2008.

An August 2012 survey by the Financial Services Authority concluded that risks were limited and had reduced as a result, inter alia, of larger margins being required by counterparty banks, but might change rapidly according to market conditions. In stressed market conditions, investors might suddenly withdraw large sums, resulting in forced asset sales. This might cause liquidity and pricing problems if it occurred across a number of funds or in one large highly leveraged fund.

=== Transparency ===
Hedge funds are structured to avoid most direct regulation (although their managers may be regulated), and are not required to publicly disclose their investment activities, except to the extent that investors generally are subject to disclosure requirements. This is in contrast to a regulated mutual fund or exchange-traded fund, which will typically have to meet regulatory requirements for disclosure. An investor in a hedge fund usually has direct access to the investment adviser of the fund, and may enjoy more personalized reporting than investors in retail investment funds. This may include detailed discussions of risks assumed and significant positions. However, this high level of disclosure is not available to non-investors, contributing to hedge funds' reputation for secrecy, while some hedge funds have very limited transparency even to investors.

Funds may choose to report some information in the interest of recruiting additional investors. Much of the data available in consolidated databases is self-reported and unverified. A study was done on two major databases containing hedge fund data. The study noted that 465 common funds had significant differences in reported information (e.g., returns, inception date, net assets value, incentive fee, management fee, investment styles, etc.) and that 5% of return numbers and 5% of NAV numbers were dramatically different. With these limitations, investors have to do their own research, which may cost on the scale of US$50,000 for a fund that is not well-established.

A lack of verification of financial documents by investors or by independent auditors has, in some cases, assisted in fraud. In the mid-2000s, Kirk Wright of International Management Associates was accused of mail fraud and other securities violations which allegedly defrauded clients of close to US$180 million. In December 2008, Bernard Madoff was arrested for running a US$50 billion Ponzi scheme that closely resembled a hedge fund and was incorrectly described as one. Several feeder hedge funds, of which the largest was Fairfield Sentry, channeled money to it. Following the Madoff case, the SEC adopted reforms in December 2009 that subjected hedge funds to an audit requirement.

The process of matching hedge funds to investors has traditionally been fairly opaque, with investments often driven by personal connections or recommendations of portfolio managers. Many funds disclose their holdings, strategy, and historic performance relative to market indices, giving investors some idea of how their money is being allocated, although individual holdings are often not disclosed. Investors are often drawn to hedge funds by the possibility of realizing significant returns, or hedging against volatility in the market. The complexity and fees associated with hedge funds are causing some to exit the market – CalPERS, the largest pension fund in the US, announced plans to completely divest from hedge funds in 2014. Some services are attempting to improve matching between hedge funds and investors: HedgeZ is designed to allow investors to easily search and sort through funds; iMatchative aims to match investors to funds through algorithms that factor in an investor's goals and behavioral profile, in hopes of helping funds and investors understand the how their perceptions and motivations drive investment decisions. Another such provider is Preqin, which was founded in 2003 as Private Equity Intelligence and later expanded to cover hedge funds and other alternative asset classes.

=== Links with analysts ===
In June 2006, prompted by a letter from Gary J. Aguirre, the U.S. Senate Judiciary Committee began an investigation into the links between hedge funds and independent analysts. Aguirre was fired from his job with the SEC when, as lead investigator of insider trading allegations against Pequot Capital Management, he tried to interview John Mack, then being considered for chief executive officer at Morgan Stanley. The Judiciary Committee and the US Senate Finance Committee issued a scathing report in 2007, which found that Aguirre had been illegally fired in reprisal for his pursuit of Mack, and in 2009 the SEC was forced to re-open its case against Pequot. Pequot settled with the SEC for US$28 million, and Arthur J. Samberg, chief investment officer of Pequot, was barred from working as an investment advisor. Pequot closed its doors under the pressure of investigations.

The systemic practice of hedge funds submitting periodic electronic questionnaires to stock analysts as a part of market research was reported by The New York Times in July 2012. According to the report, one motivation for the questionnaires was to obtain subjective information not available to the public and possible early notice of trading recommendations that could produce short-term market movements.

=== Value in a mean/variance efficient portfolio ===
According to modern portfolio theory, rational investors will seek to hold portfolios that are mean/variance efficient (that is, portfolios that offer the highest level of return per unit of risk). One of the attractive features of hedge funds (in particular market neutral and similar funds) is that they sometimes have a modest correlation with traditional assets such as equities. This means that hedge funds have a potentially quite valuable role in investment portfolios as diversifiers, reducing overall portfolio risk.

However, there are at least three reasons why one might not wish to allocate a high proportion of assets into hedge funds. These reasons are:

- Hedge funds are highly individual, making it hard to estimate the likely returns or risks.
- Hedge funds' correlation with other assets tends to rise during stressful market events, making them much less useful for diversification in bad times than they may appear in good times.
- Hedge fund returns are reduced considerably by the high fees that are typically charged.

Several studies have suggested that hedge funds are sufficiently diversifying to merit inclusion in investor portfolios, but this is disputed for example by Mark Kritzman who performed a mean-variance optimization calculation on an opportunity set that consisted of a stock index fund, a bond index fund, and ten hypothetical hedge funds. The optimizer found that a mean-variance efficient portfolio did not contain any allocation to hedge funds, largely because of the impact of performance fees. To demonstrate this, Kritzman repeated the optimization using an assumption that the hedge funds took no performance fees. The result from this second optimization was an allocation of 74% to hedge funds.

Hedge funds tend to perform poorly during equity bear markets, just when an investor needs part of their portfolio to add value. For example, in January–September 2008, the Credit Suisse/Tremont Hedge Fund Index returned -9.87%. According to the same index series, even "dedicated short bias" funds returned −6.08% in September 2008, when Lehman Brothers collapsed.

== See also ==
- Activist shareholder
- Alternative investment
- Naked Capitalism
- Corporate governance
- Fund governance
- Investment banking
- List of hedge funds
- Vulture fund
