= Reverse convertible securities =

A reverse convertible security is a type of convertible security where a bond or short-term note can be converted to cash, debt or equity at a set date by the issuer based on an underlying stock. In effect it is a type of option on the maturity date where the bond can be converted to shares or cash. For the investor they get the advantage of a steady stream of income due to the payment of a high coupon rate, but will either get back their principle (par value) or a predetermined number of shares in the underlying stock if they are lower. The coupon rate is typically higher because the investor participates in the risk that the underlying shares are lower at the maturity date.

In the context of structured product or security, a reverse convertible can be linked to an equity index or a basket of indices. In such case, the capital repayment at maturity is cash settled, either 100% of principal, or less if the underlying index falls conditional on barrier is hit in the case of barrier reverse convertibles.

== Description ==
=== Features ===
These are bonds or short-term coupon bearing notes, which are designed to provide an enhanced yield while maintaining certain equity-like risks. Their investment value is derived from the underlying equity exposure, paid in the form of fixed coupons. Owners receive full principal back at maturity if the Knock-in Level is not breached (which is typically 70-80% of the initial reference price). If the underlying stock falls in value, the investor will receive shares of stock which will be worth less than his original investment. The underlying stock, index or basket of equities is defined as Reference Shares. In most cases, Reverse convertibles are linked to a single stock.

There are also inverse reverse convertibles, which are the opposite of a reverse convertible. The owner benefits as long the underlying stock does not go above a predetermined barrier. If the underlying stock breaches the barrier, the owner will receive the principal minus the percentage of the movement against him.

These are both types of structured products, which are sophisticated instruments and carry a significant risk of loss of capital.

In a low interest rate and high market volatility environment, reverse convertibles are popular as they provide significantly enhanced yield for the investors. By receiving enhanced coupons, investors take on the risk of losing part of the capital. Prior to the turn of the millennium (2000), reverse convertibles mostly consisted of investors shorting standard at-the-money put options. Investors would lose capital if at maturity the underlying fell below the initial level. To increase the protection for investors, barrier reverse convertibles were introduced whereby investors were instead shorting at-the-money down-and-in put options. The additional barrier event increased the protection for the investors, as the put option would not come into effect unless the (down) barrier was hit. The barrier protection feature triggered much increased reverse convertible issuances in UK in the early 2000s as well as in the European retail markets. By the early 2010s, the (barrier) reverse convertibles were also among the most popular structured products in US.

While the barrier protection feature was beneficial for investors, for the issuers, managing and hedging relatively long-dated (e.g. 3~5 years) equity barrier risks were a serious challenge. The hedging parameters (Greeks) near the barrier could be unstable, and they could suddenly change which would lead to a massive increase in trading volumes in the process of hedging. In contrast to FX underlyings, equity underlyings for the reverse convertibles tend to have much less liquidity. The problems would become more severe as and when the products were introduced to the mass retail market. To solve these practical problems during the product design process, various technologies were adopted in the barrier reverse convertible pricing models to deal with barrier concentration risks. Reverse convertibles nowadays account for a large portion the structured products issued for retail and private investors. The issuances of other breeds of reverse convertibles, such as those combining a callable payoff, or a knockout clause, have also increased substantially with the ever changing market conditions.

=== Risks ===
At maturity, the owner receives either 100% of their original investment or a predetermined number of shares of the underlying stock, in addition to the stated coupon payments. The owner's earning potential is limited to the security's stated coupon, because he receives coupon payments regardless of the performance of the underlying reference shares. Risk potential is the same as for the underlying security, less the coupon payment.

Coupon payments are the obligation of the issuer and are paid on a monthly or quarterly basis and are determined by the issuer at inception. These instruments are sold by prospectus or offering circular, and prices on these notes are updated intra day to reflect the activity of the underlying equity. The rule of thumb is: The higher the coupon payment, the greater likelihood of receiving stock at maturity.

== Maturity options ==
=== Delivery at maturity ===
At maturity, there are two possible outcomes:

- Cash Delivery: If the stock closes at or above the initial share price upon valuation date, regardless of whether the stock closed below the knock-in level during the holding period, or if the stock closes below the initial share price, but has never closed below the knock-in level.
- Physical Delivery: If the underlying shares closed below the knock-in level at any time during the holding period and does not trade back up above the initial share price on valuation date (four days prior to maturity).

=== Physical delivery ===
The initial share price is determined on the trade date. The final valuation of the shares is based on the closing price of the reference shares determined four days prior to maturity. If the investor is delivered physical shares, their value will be less than the initial investment.

There are three possible scenarios:

Scenario 1 -Cash Delivery	Reference share closing price is above the initial share price of the note on valuation date (four days prior to maturity), regardless of whether the stock closed below the knock-in level. Investor receives "Cash Delivery Amount" (Par), at maturity.
Scenario 2 - Cash Delivery	Reference share closing price is below the initial share price of the note on valuation date (four days prior to maturity), but never closed below the knock-in level. Investor receives "Cash Delivery Amount" (Par) at maturity.
Scenario 3 - Physical Delivery	Reference share closing price is below the initial price of the note at valuation date (four days prior to maturity), and has closed below the downside knock-in level during the holding period. Investors receive "Physical Delivery Amount", or shares of stock, at maturity. Predetermined number of shares delivered to the investor if closing price of reference shares below initial price. Physical Delivery Amount = (Original Investment Amount / Initial Price of Underlying Asset).

=== Trading ===
They trade flat and accrue on a 30/360 or actual/365 basis. End of day pricing is posted on Bloomberg L.P. and/or the internet. Pricing fluctuates intraday. Reverse Convertibles in the United States are registered with the U.S. Securities and Exchange Commission (SEC).

== Ratings ==
These are an unsecured debt obligation of the issuer, not the reference company, thus they carry the rating of the issuer. The creditworthiness of the issuer does not affect or enhance the likely performance of the investment other than the ability of the issuer to meet its obligations.

== Taxes ==
For tax purposes Reverse convertible notes are considered to have two components: a debt portion and a put option. At maturity, the option component is taxed as a short-term capital gain if the investor receives the cash settlement. In the case of physical delivery, the option component will reduce the tax basis of the Reference Shares delivered to their accounts.

== Key aspects ==
- The price of the reference shares may decline during the term of the note, which will affect the investor negatively, while the investor does not have the same price appreciation potential as the reference shares, because at maturity the most the investor will receive is his original principal amount.
- Investors selling notes prior to maturity may receive a market price which may be higher or lower than par value, not necessarily reflecting any increase or decrease in the market price of the underlying equity.
- Reverse convertibles do not guarantee return of principal at maturity.
- The market price of the Reverse convertibles may be influenced by unpredictable market factors.
- If the underlying security issues a previously unannounced special dividend, and the security were to trade ex-dividend prior to maturity of the reverse convertible, it is possible that an investor in the structure may suffer a capital loss, as they are not eligible to receive the special dividend.

== See also ==
- Convertible bond
- Convertible security
- Exchangeable bond
- Structured product
