= Backfill bias =

Backfill bias is a form of selection bias in financial data. If a private investment fund such as a hedge fund performs well, it may decide to report its performance to financial databases. However, if it performs poorly, its performance is less likely to be reported. This biases the data.

== See also ==
- Reporting bias
- Survivorship bias
