= Long/short equity =

Hedge fund investment strategy

Long/short equity is an investment strategy generally associated with hedge funds. It involves buying equities that are expected to increase in value and selling short equities that are expected to decrease in value. This is different from the risk reversal strategies where investors will simultaneously buy a call option and sell a put option to simulate being long in a stock.

== Overview ==
Typically, equity long/short investing is based on "bottom up" analysis based primarily on the analysis of the financial statements of the individual companies, in which investments are made. There may also be "top down" analysis of the risks and opportunities offered by industries, sectors, countries, and the macroeconomic situation.

Long/short covers a wide variety of strategies. There are generalists, and managers who focus on certain industries and sectors or certain regions. Managers may specialize in a category — for example, large cap or small cap, value or growth. There are many trading styles, with frequent or dynamic traders and some longer-term investors.

A fund manager typically attempts to reduce volatility by either diversifying or hedging positions across individual regions, industries, sectors and market capitalization bands and hedging against un-diversifiable risk such as market risk. In addition to being required of the portfolio as a whole, neutrality may in addition be required for individual regions, industries, sectors, and market capitalization bands.

There is wide variation in the degree to which managers prioritize seeking high returns, which may involve concentrated and leveraged portfolios, and seeking low volatility, which involves more diversification and hedging.

== Equitized strategy ==
This is in addition to market neutral strategy, as it adds a permanent stock index futures overlay, which makes profit or losses, depending on the movement of the market. Your portfolio then has a full equity market exposure.

== Hedging example ==
A hedge fund might sell short one automobile industry stock, while buying another—for example, short $1 million of DaimlerChrysler, long $1 million of Ford. With this position, any event that causes all auto industry stocks to fall will cause a profit on the DaimlerChrysler position and a matching loss on the Ford position. Similarly, events that cause both stocks to rise—for example a rise in the market as a whole—will have little or no effect on the position.

Presumably the hedge fund has sold DaimlerChrysler and bought Ford because the manager expects Ford to perform better. If the manager is correct, the fund should profit irrespective of market and sector moves.

== Market neutral strategies ==
Market neutral strategies can be seen as the limiting case of equity long/short, in which the long and short portfolios of the fund are balanced with great care so that a very high degree of hedging is achieved. Some advantages of market neutral strategies include the potential to generate positive returns even in down markets and to exhibit lower volatility and market-correlation compared with broad equity indexes.

"Market neutrality" refers to hedging out market risk, which can be managed through the use of derivatives, such as futures on market indexes. Market neutral funds usually seek to hedge against most or all predictable risk exposures.

An extension on the market neutral strategy is the factor neutral strategy. The factor neutral strategy is neutral on market risk, as well as major factors like momentum and large cap vs small cap. This is a step towards more modern capital market models like the Fama–French three-factor model.

== Problems ==
There are many difficulties with managing long/short funds. These include the difficulties of estimating and hedging the risks to which a portfolio is exposed, and the requirement to manage unsuccessful short positions in an active manner. Short positions that are losing money grow to become an increasingly large part of the portfolio, and their price can increase without limit.

To make money, the hedge fund must successfully predict which stocks will perform better. It requires making intelligent use of the available information, but this is not enough—it also requires making better use of the available information than large numbers of capable investors. This strategy is primarily implemented by hedge funds and sophisticated institutions.
