= Convertible security =

Stock trading reference

A convertible security is a financial instrument whose holder has the right to convert it into another security of the same issuer. Most convertible securities are convertible bonds or preferred stocks that pay regular interest and can be converted into shares of the issuer's common stock. Convertible securities typically include other embedded options, such as call or put options. Consequently, determining the value of convertible securities can be a complex exercise. The complex valuation issue may attract specialized professional investors, including arbitrageurs and hedge funds who try to exploit disparities in the relationship between the price of the convertible security and the underlying common stock.

== Types ==
Types of convertible securities include:

- Convertible bond
- Reverse convertible bond
- Convertible preferred stock
- Asset-linked bond: Although a bond with an asset warrant is a type of convertible security, regular warrants are not. A regular warrant provides an equity option, where the holder may opt to buy newly issued shares at a determined exercise price and date. Equity capital notes are similar to warrants, except that there is no exercise price.
- Asset-linked note
- Bond with asset warrant

== Characteristics of convertible bonds and preferred stock ==
Because convertibles are a hybrid security, their market price can be affected by both movements in interest rates (like a conventional bond) and the company's stock price (because of the embedded option to convert to the underlying stock). The minimum price at which a convertible bond will trade is based on its fixed income characteristics: the stream of coupon payments and eventual maturity at par value. This is known as its "bond equivalent" or "straight bond" value. The price of the convertible bond will not drop below straight value if the stock price declines. In return for this degree of protection, investors who purchase a convertible bond rather than the underlying stock typically pay a premium over the stock's current market price.

The price that the convertible investor effectively pays for the right to convert to common stock is called the market conversion price, and is calculated as shown below. The conversion ratio - the number of shares the investor receives when exchanging the bond for common stock - is specified in the bond's indenture.

$$\mathsf{market\ conversion\ price} = \mathsf{market\ price\ of\ convertible\ bond} / \mathsf{conversion\ ratio}$$

Once the actual market price of the underlying stock exceeds the market conversion price embedded in the convertible, any further rise in the stock price will drive up the convertible security's price by at least the same percentage. Thus, the market conversion price can be thought of as a "break-even point."

If the price of the stock decreases to the point that the straight bond value is much greater than the conversion value, the convertible will trade much like a straight bond. This is referred to as a bond equivalent or busted convertible.

== Advantages to the investor ==
Convertible bonds generally provide a higher current yield than common stock due to their fixed income features and superior claim to the assets of the company in the event of default. If the value of the underlying common stock rises, the value of the convertible should rise as well. The investor can benefit from the stock's upside movement by selling the bond without converting it to stock. Alternatively, the value of the common stock could fall, but in that case the convertible's price will decline only to the point where it provides an acceptable return as a bond equivalent.

== Disadvantages to the investor ==
Most convertibles contain a call provision that allows the issuer to force conversion to the common stock. Such a provision limits the value associated with potential growth in the stock price.

Convertibles typically have a lower yield than a nonconvertible, because the investor is receiving an additional right: that of conversion to the underlying stock. However, if the issuer's business does not grow and prosper, the investor has an opportunity cost associated with lost current yield compared to a nonconvertible, and a capital loss if the convertible security's price drops below the price the investor paid to purchase it.

== See also ==
- Convertible currency
