= Asset location =

Asset location (AL) is a term used in personal finance to refer to how investors distribute their investments across savings vehicles including taxable accounts, tax-exempt accounts (e.g., Tax-free savings accounts (TFSA), Roth IRA, Individual savings accounts (ISA), Tax-exempt special savings accounts (TESSA)), tax-deferred accounts (e.g., Canadian registered retirement savings plan (RRSP), American 401(k) and individual retirement accounts (IRAs)), British self-invested personal pension (SIPP), Irish Personal Retirement Savings Accounts (RPSA), and German Riester Pensions, trust accounts (e.g., grantor retainer annuity trusts, generation-skipping trusts, charitable remainder trusts, charitable lead trusts), variable life insurance policies, foundations, and onshore vs. offshore accounts.

While asset allocation (AA) determines what assets to own and in what proportions, AL determines where those assets are held. While the objective of AA is to create portfolios with the greatest return for a level of risk, and to optimize individuals' risk exposure according to their risk tolerance, goals and investment time frame, the objective of AL is to maximize the benefits of different account types – usually to minimize taxes. There are other objectives that can be personal (e.g., the liquidity of the wealth, the expected use of the funds, privacy, etc.).

In the discussion below the effective tax rate for any asset depends on a personal tax bracket, different countries' treatment of different types of income, personal frequency of realizing the tax liability (e.g. capital gains only taxable when sold after a multi-year holding period), the mix of income types generated by an asset, and the net tax effect that includes both tax debits and credits (e.g. the treatment of dividend income in Canada and Great Britain).

== Location choice methodology ==
=== Tax rates ===
Although there is no academic support, it is common (now declining) to hear that assets with the highest effective tax rates should be prioritized in tax shelter accounts. This will have been broadly appropriate over the 30 years from the 1980s to the 2000s in North America, as interest rates declined and debt's total returns matched the returns of equity. The rule is dependent on the assumption that total returns from different asset types are equal. When interest rates are low and expected to rise that assumption will not be valid.

=== Tax efficiency ===
Another common metric to decide which assets should be prioritized is tax efficiency. This equals the dollars of tax payable per principal invested – the multiple of the asset's rate of return by its effective tax rate. Another way to look at the same metric is as the difference between the asset's nominal rate of return and its after tax rate of return.

This metric measures the tax sheltering benefits of the first year only. Reed finds that this metric fails over the life of the accounts. Given two assets with the same tax efficiency, the asset with the larger rate of return will always create larger benefits in tax exempt accounts. Even when a high return asset has a lower tax efficiency, given enough time it creates more benefits.

It is only when the effective tax rate is very low that its importance relative to the rate of return is equally strong or stronger.

=== Cumulative benefit ===
Reed calculates the cumulative tax savings over varying time spans from tax free growth. For tax deferred accounts there may be an additional bonus (or penalty) from a lower (or higher) tax rate on withdrawal vs. contribution. Assets with the largest benefits are given priority into tax shelters. He points out that rebalancing to some asset allocation will reduce the benefits from asset location.

He concludes that "it all depends" and general rules of thumb are not valid. For example, given enough time high return assets create the largest benefits from tax-free growth, but there may not be enough time, or the high return asset may result in a portfolio large enough to create a penalty from higher withdrawal tax rates.

=== Asset types ===
Common advice is to locate tax inefficient assets (such as bonds and real estate investment trusts) in the tax advantaged accounts. This is to fully utilize any long-term capital gain, or capital gains allowances available in taxable accounts. Place income generating investments into tax-deferred or non-taxable accounts, and place equity investments into taxable accounts. The deciding factor is apparently the effective tax rate on the asset's income.

For the same reason, tax exempt bonds, national savings certificates and other similar tax privileged securities are best located in fully taxable accounts. Shoven and Sialm provided an analysis of the decision point when income producing equities should be sheltered and optimal portfolio choice for each type of account. Individual stocks, passive index funds, or exchange-traded funds are generally regarded as tax efficient and, consequently, better placed in taxable accounts, when more heavily taxed income generating assets, such as bonds, real estate investment trusts, and so on, are available for secretion in a tax sheltered location.

Actively managed mutual funds or unit trusts may also prove to be better located in tax sheltered vehicles, because equities held through financial intermediaries tend to be taxed more, due to high turnover, than individual equities held by an investor for the long term, who has the opportunity to plan the realization of gains and offset losses. Siegel and Montgomery demonstrate conclusively that taxes and inflation substantially dampen compound returns especially for equity investors.

== An alternate model ==
William Reichenstein proposes an alternate model. He ignores completely the tax sheltering benefits of tax deferred and tax exempt accounts. His AL objective is not to maximize those benefits. He uses the AL to fine tune the AA decision using mean variance optimization (MVO) of Modern portfolio theory. MVO uses the means, variances, and covariance matrix of all assets, along with a utility function to manage risk tolerances.

When assets are held in taxable accounts their after tax means and variances will be smaller than for those in tax shelter accounts. Reichenstein considers each asset type to have a taxable variant and a tax free variant, with their different metrics. The MVO process results in an optimal AA for both the taxable and the tax free asset. The AL falls out from this conclusion.

== Patterns of behavior ==
Surveys of households have shown that there is often a gulf between where assets are located and where some people think they ought to be, to provide an optimal tax outcome. Reed's rebalancing model rarely shows a difference of more than 10% after 30 years, unless withdrawals from tax deferred accounts are at lower rates. So it may be that households are correct. Amromin argues that job income insecurity, penalties and restrictions on withdrawals from tax deferred accounts explain why people are tax inefficient with their investments. Employers' matches in defined contribution retirement plans and the structure of the social security system also play a part in driving low tax equity investments into sheltered accounts.

Bodie and Crane studied TIAA-CREF participants and concluded that investors chose similar asset allocations in their taxable and tax deferred accounts, with little apparent regard for the benefits of tax efficient asset location. Barber and Odean surveyed brokerage records and found that more than half of the households held taxable bonds in their taxable accounts, despite available alternatives, and that the preference for holding equity mutual funds in retirement accounts appeared to be stronger than that for holding taxable bonds.

Other commentators suggest decisions concerning the use of home equity and mortgage debt as a substitute for consumer debt have driven choice of portfolio location. An idealized example shows that over a 25-year interval, the difference between extreme asset location choices yielded a compounded 18% differential in return.

== See also ==
- Income tax
