= Convertible arbitrage =

Investment strategy

Convertible arbitrage is a market-neutral investment strategy often employed by hedge funds. It involves the simultaneous purchase of convertible securities and the short sale of the same issuer's common stock.

The premise of the strategy is that the convertible is sometimes priced inefficiently relative to the underlying stock, for reasons that range from illiquidity to market psychology. In particular, the equity option embedded in the convertible bond may be a source of cheap volatility, which convertible arbitrageurs can then exploit.

The number of shares sold short usually reflects a delta-neutral or market-neutral ratio. As a result, under normal market conditions, the arbitrageur expects the combined position to be insensitive to small fluctuations in the price of the underlying stock. However, maintaining a market-neutral position may require rebalancing transactions, a process called dynamic delta hedging. This rebalancing adds to the return of convertible arbitrage strategies.

== Risks ==
As with most successful arbitrage strategies, convertible arbitrage has attracted a large number of market participants, creating intense competition and reducing the effectiveness of the strategy. For example, many convertible arbitrageurs suffered losses in early 2005 when the credit of General Motors was downgraded at the same time Kirk Kerkorian was making an offer for GM's stock. Since most arbitrageurs were long GM debt and short the equity, they were hurt on both sides. Going back a lot further, many such "arbs" sustained big losses in the so-called "crash of '87". In theory, when a stock declines, the associated convertible bond will decline less, because it is protected by its value as a fixed-income instrument: it pays interest periodically. In the 1987 stock market crash, however, many convertible bonds declined more than the stocks into which they were convertible, apparently for liquidity reasons, with the market for the stocks being much more liquid than the relatively small market for the bonds. Arbitrageurs who relied on the traditional relationship between stock and bond gained less from their short stock positions than they lost on their long bond positions.

== Controversy ==
In the past, most people in the market believed that convertible bond arbitrage was mainly due to convertible underpricing. However, recent studies find empirical evidence that convertible bonds usually generate relatively large positive gammas that can make delta-neutral portfolios highly profitable. Other research suggests that arbitrageurs in general take advantage of illiquidity and higher volatility.

== See also ==
- Convertible bond
- Convertible security
- Rational pricing § Shares
