= Capital note =

Types of securities

Capital notes are several types of securities. "Capital note" has a number of meanings, as it can be either an equity security, a debt security or a form of security used in structured finance. In all cases, the use of the term "capital" is to denote that the security is relatively junior in the issuing corporation's order of priorities in claims for its assets.

== Convertibles ==
Capital notes are a form of convertible security exercisable into shares. They are equity vehicles. Capital notes are similar to warrants, except that they often do not have an expiration date or an exercise price (hence, the entire consideration the company expects to receive, for its future issue of shares, is paid when the capital note is issued). Capital notes may be issued in connection with a debt-for-equity swap restructuring: instead of promptly issuing the debt-replacing shares, the company issues convertible securities, in order to postpone the event of share dilution.

== Bonds ==
Alternately, a capital note is a bond with a very long maturity horizon, reaching several decades (sometimes as much as 50 or 100 years). Unlike equity securities, these capital notes do mature at some point; therefore, they form part of the company's liabilities and not part of equity. However, since their maturity is so far in the future, they are treated as equity for practical purposes; the company keeps the money raised through them inside its balance sheet for a very long time. Banks and other financial institutions issue these bonds to satisfy regulatory demands regarding capital requirements, specifically under the Basel Accords. In the Basel "tiers" system, capital notes are treated as close to equity, as both reinforce the bank's "capital". Additionally, bank capital notes are usually not collateralized and are contractually subordinated, forming a junior class of debt. Similar terms might be found in redeemable preferred shares.

Contrary to the warrant-like capital notes described above, these capital notes are usually not convertible, so they represent no current or future stake in the corporation's equity (share capital).

Municipalities in New York were allowed by state law in 1942 to issue Capital notes for certain projects. Such municipal capital bonds were issued frequently, for example, by Monroe County, New York in 1971.

== Structured finance ==
In structured finance, the capital note is the most junior security issued by a structured investment vehicle. It is comparable to the equity tranche of a CDO. Investors who buy the capital notes are the first in line to bear risk if the cash flows from the SIV's assets are insufficient to cover promised payments to all investors.

The capital notes can be hybrid.

See securitization transaction for more details on how the process of slicing up risk (or "tranching") works.
