= Adams Street Partners =

Investment firm based in Chicago

- Type: Private
- Industry: Investment management
- Founded: March 14, 1984; 42 years ago
- Headquarters: One North Wacker, Chicago, Illinois, U.S.
- Key people: T. Bondurant French (chairman); Jeffrey Diehl (Managing Partner)
- AUM: US$65 billion (2026)
- Number of employees: 263 (2023)
- Website: www.adamsstreetpartners.com

Adams Street Partners is an American private equity firm headquartered in Chicago. As of April 2026, Adams Street Partners oversees about $65 billion in assets under management. The firm was initial formed as a unit of First Chicago Corporation, the parent company of First National Bank of Chicago, and was spun out into a separate company Brinson Partners in 1989. It was acquired by Swiss Bank Corporation (SBC) in 1994 before the merger of Union Bank of Switzerland and SBC in 1998, when Brinson Partners became part of UBS Asset Management. The firm was spun out again in 2001 as Adams Street Partners and, in 2008, bought back any remaining shares held by UBS Asset Management to become fully employee owned.

== History ==
=== Formation as First Chicago Investment Advisors ===
Adams Street Partners was founded on March 14, 1984, as a trust company and subsidiary of First Chicago Corporation, the parent company of First National Bank of Chicago. The firm was then known as First Chicago Investment Advisors, and Gary P. Brinson was president and chief executive officer. Since 1979, Brinson had served as the chief investment officer of a trust department within First Chicago before the formation of a subsidiary. As of its formation as a subsidiary in 1984, First Chicago Investment Advisors managed $5.6 billion in assets including stocks, securities, commercial real estate and venture capital investments.

By September 1987, the firm managed $9 billion, but kept only 45 percent of its assets in the stock market, predicting the market was entering a correction. In line with this prediction, the firm reduced its stock investments and hedged its remaining holdings by shorting the S&P 500. This protected the firm from the Black Monday stock market crash in October 1987, and the firm recorded only a 3 percent loss that month compared to 21 percent drop in the S&P 500.

As part of speculation in January 1988 that the parent holding company will be broken up for sale, First Chicago Investment Advisors was individually valued between $125 million to $150 million.

=== Brinson Partners and acquisition by Swiss Bank and UBS ===
In 1989, Brinson led a $102 million management buyout of the subsidiary from First Chicago Corporation and spun it out as a separate firm named Brinson Partners. The deal included $70 million in cash, $15 million in a subordinated note, 10 percent ownership, and $17 million in dividends. With the management group of about 70 people owning 70 percent of the firm, Brinson Partners became "one of the largest employee-owned investment advisory services in the nation." Following the buyout, the firm continued to manage $12 billion in assets and employed a total of 120 people in Chicago, London, and Tokyo.

In October 1992, Brinson Partners moved its headquarters into the 12-story Rookery Building at 209 South LaSalle Street in downtown Chicago, occupying the top four floors of the building by May 1993.

In 1994, Swiss Bank Corporation (SBC) acquired Brinson Partners for $750 million in stocks. As part of the deal, the partners in the firm including CEO Brinson received "an 'earn-out' of their stakes over the next 11 years." At the time, Brinson Partners' business focused on investment management of $36 billion in assets for pension funds and other institutional investors. The previous year, the firm made about $35 million in earnings. In 1996, Swiss Bank Corp. introduced a new class of shares called the SwissKey funds for seven Brinson mutual funds. This lowered the minimum allowed investment from $100,000 to $1,000 and, for the first time, made Brinson Partners' funds available to small individual investors.

In 1998, SBC merged with Union Bank of Switzerland to form UBS. Subsequently, Brinson Partners operated as part of UBS Asset Management.

=== Recent history as Adams Street Partners ===
In March 2000, Brinson announced that he would be retiring at the end of the year. Following Brinson retirement, the investment management firm underwent a reorganization. On January 1, 2001, Brinson Partners spun out Adams Street as a separate firm with T. Bondurant French as the new CEO. In May 2008, Adams Street bought back from UBS Asset Management the remaining 24.9% stake in the firm for $156 million, making Adams Street fully employee owned.

In May 2014, Royal Bank of Scotland sold a minority stake of its private equity unit to Adams Street for $167 million.

In February 2015, French became chairman of the firm and promoted Jeff Diehl to lead the firm as the managing partner. The role of CEO was eliminated in line with the firm's status as an employee-owned company.

As of May 2015, the majority (74%) of Adams Street's assets were in fund-of-funds strategies. In 2016, ASP launched its own venture capital and private credit business. The first of the Venture Innovation Funds, through which the firm pursued the fund-of-funds strategy on venture capital funds, closed in 2016 and raised $202 million. The same year, Adams Street launched its first private credit fund. In June 2017, Adams Street separately raised $475 million in new capital for direct investment in businesses in the technology and healthcare industries. The firm also continued to raise nearly $800 million in capital for its flagship global fund within which its venture capital investments were previously subsumed in various fund of funds.

In October 2018, the firm closed on $426 million in capital raised for a second fund-of-funds vehicle, Venture Innovation Fund II. At the same time, Adams Street reported $34 billion in assets under management overall. In 2020, Adams Street's Venture Innovation Fund IV closed and began investing with $818 million in raised capital. Adams Street’s second private credit fund raised more than $3 billion before closing in 2022. In October 2024, Adams Street announced that the firm had raised $1.2 billion in capital for investment in venture funds and direct investment in private companies. The firm indicated that 70% of the newly raised funds will be deployed in the fund of funds strategy.

== Operations ==
Adams Street Partners is an employee-owned business. The firm is headquartered in Chicago, Illinois. As of April 2026, Adams Street Partners oversees about $65 billion in assets under management.
