= Gary P. Brinson =

American businessman

- Born: 1943 (age 82–83); Seattle, Washington
- Education: Seattle University (BA, 1966); Washington State University (MBA, 1968)
- Occupation: Investment management
- Employers: UBS (Retired); Brinson Partners (Prior); First National Bank of Chicago (Prior)
- Known for: Research on asset allocation Founder of Brinson Partners

Gary P. Brinson is a former investor and money manager. He is the founder of Brinson Partners a Chicago-based asset management firm acquired in 1994 by Swiss Bank Corporation, the predecessor of UBS, and Adams Street Partners. Prior to retiring in 2000, Brinson would run the asset management division of Swiss Bank Corporation and later UBS Global Asset Management.

He is the co-author of two books on global investing and has authored numerous articles on an array of investment topics. Brinson has been called one of the investment field's "Living Legends" alongside investors such as George Russell, Jr., Warren Buffett, and Bill Gross.

== Career ==
Brinson was born in Seattle, Washington in 1943. His father worked as a bus driver and his mother worked at Sears as a clerk. He graduated from Seattle University in 1966 and would go on to receive an MBA from Washington State University in 1968.

Brinson entered the investment management business in the late 1960s as an analyst at Travelers Insurance Company. In 1979, Brinson left Travelers to join the trust department of First National Bank of Chicago as chief investment officer. By 1981, Brinson had assembled the team that would become First Chicago Investment Advisors and later Brinson Partners.

First Chicago Investment Advisors became a separate money management company in 1983. Through the 1980s, Brinson established himself as a pioneer in the development of the theory of asset allocation. Brinson pushed for allocation across stocks, bonds, cash, real estate, venture capital and other alternative asset classes using simple cost effective investment strategies. This would largely become conventional wisdom among money managers in the 1990s.

In 1989, Brinson led a US$100 million management buyout of his firm from First Chicago Corporation, acquiring approximately 75% of the company with a large group of partners and investors. Over the next five years, he built up the firm to approximately US$36 billion of assets under management. Brinson focused on providing access for U.S. institutions to global markets. The firm, which also managed a series of mutual funds, had emerged as one of the largest managers of pension plans in the U.S.

In 1994, Swiss Bank Corporation was in the midst of a series of acquisitions that included O'Connor & Associates, S.G. Warburg & Co., Dillon Read & Co. and culminated in the bank's merger with the Union Bank of Switzerland in 1998. Swiss Bank announced the acquisition of Brinson Partners and brought in Brinson to run the bank's asset management unit. Swiss Bank Corporation paid US$750 million to acquire Brinson Partners, resulting in a profit to Brinson and his partners of US$460 million on the sale of their 75% stake in the company.

Following the acquisition of Brinson Partners, Gary Brinson ran Swiss Bank's asset management business and after the merger with UBS, Brinson was named chief investment officer of UBS Global Asset Management.

Brinson retired from UBS in early 2000 just prior to the crash of the dot-com bubble. Brinson had grown disenfranchised over the previous years with the runaway internet bubble and its detachment from fundamentals and value investing.

== Influence on investment and finance ==
Brison is acknowledged for helping to establish the foundations of investment portfolio Performance Attribution by introducing the Brinson model, through two articles written by Brinson and Fachler (1985) and Brinson, Hood, and Beebower (1986).

=== Other affiliations ===
Brinson established the Brinson Foundation as non-profit organization focused on supporting educational, public health, and scientific research programs.
