= Tax advantage =

Financial incentive

Tax advantage refers to the economic bonus which applies to certain accounts or investments that are, by statute, tax-reduced, tax-deferred, or tax-free. Examples of tax-advantaged accounts and investments include retirement plans, education savings accounts, medical savings accounts, and government bonds. Governments establish tax advantages to encourage private individuals to contribute money when it is considered to be in the public interest.

== Benefits ==
Tax advantages provide an incentive to engage in certain investments and accounts, functioning like a government subsidy. For example, individual retirement accounts are tax-advantaged since they are tax-deferred. By encouraging investment in these accounts, there is a reduced need for the government to support citizens later in life by spending money on welfare or other government expenses. Capital gains tax rate benefits may also spur investment.

== Types of tax-advantaged accounts and investments ==
=== Retirement plans ===
The most well-known example is retirement plans, which often offer tax advantages to incentivize saving for retirement.

In countries in which the average age of the population is increasing, tax advantages may put pressure on pension schemes. For example, where benefits are funded on a pay-as-you-go basis, the benefits paid to those receiving a pension come directly from the contributions of those of working age. If the proportion of pensioners to working-age people rises, the contributions needed from working people will also rise proportionately. In the United States, the rapid onset of Baby Boomer retirement is currently causing such a problem.

However, there are international limitations regarding tax advantages realized through pensions plans. If a person with dual citizen in the United States and in the United Kingdom, they may have tax liabilities to both. If this person is living in the United Kingdom, their pension could have tax advantages in the UK, for example, but not in the US. Even though a UK pension may be exempt from UK tax, it doesn't necessarily mean that it is exempt from US taxes. In short, a US Tax payer with dual citizenship may have to pay taxes on the gains from the UK pension to the United States government, but not the United Kingdom.

In order to reduce the burden on such schemes, many governments give privately funded retirement plans a tax advantaged status in order to encourage more people to contribute to such arrangements. Governments often exclude such contributions from an employee's taxable income, while allowing employers to receive tax deductions for contributions to plan funds. Investment earnings in pension funds are almost universally excluded from income tax while accumulating, prior to payment. Payments to retirees and their beneficiaries also sometimes receive favorable tax treatment. In return for a pension scheme's tax advantaged status, governments typically enact restrictions to discourage access to a pension fund's assets before retirement.

In the United States, tax-advantaged retirement accounts include 401(k) plans, 403(b) plans, individual retirement accounts, and supplemental retirement accounts. These accounts have proliferated since they were introduced in 1978. As of 2015, they accounted for half of all long-term mutual fund assets.

==== Annuities ====
Investing in annuities may allow investors to realize tax advantages that are not realized through other tax-deferred retirement accounts, such as 401k and IRAs. One of the great advantages of annuities is they allow an investor to store away large amounts of cash and defer paying taxes. There is no yearly limit to contributions for annuities. This is especially useful for those approaching retirement age that may not have saved large sums throughout previous years. The total investment compounds annually without any federal taxes. This allows each dollar in the entire investment to accrue interest, which could potentially be an advantage compared to taxable investments. Additionally, upon cashing the annuity out, the investor can decide to receive a lump-sum payment, or develop a more spread out payout plan.

=== Education savings ===
Tax-advantaged savings accounts are designed to encourage saving for education expenses. In the United States, tax-advantaged savings vehicles include Coverdell education savings accounts and 529 plans.

=== Medical savings ===
In Singapore and other countries, medical savings accounts are tax-deferred.

=== Real estate ===
In order to encourage home ownership, there are tax deductions on mortgage payments.

In the United States, real estate investments yield considerable tax advantages. One benefit is the ability to regain the cost of income producing (for example, commercial real estate) properties through depreciation. When a property is bought in the United States, the cost of the building and land are capitalized. If the building is a commercial property or a rental property, used in a business, the cost of the building is depreciated over 39 years for non-residential buildings and 27.5 years for residential buildings using the straight-line depreciation method for tax purposes. The building's cost is written off over the lifespan of the building by annual depreciation deductions. Thus, the building owner receives these depreciation deductions as tax advantages at their income tax rate. Upon the sale of a property, depreciation recapture is the part of the gains that the depreciation deductions are responsible for during the period of ownership. The following is an example to show the idea of depreciation in a clear manner. A building owner buys a building for $20 million. After 5 years the owner has taken $1 million of depreciation deductions. Now, the building owner's basis in the building is $19 million. If the owner decides to sell the building for $25 million, the building owner will realize a gain of $6 million ($25 million less $19 million). Oftentimes people wrongly assume that this $6 million is taxed at a capital gains rate. However, this is a common misconception. In this example, $1 million of the gain would actually be taxed at the depreciation recapture rate, and the other $5 million at the capital gains rate.

In New Zealand, real estate investors receive a tax advantage. Investors can claim the mortgage interest they pay as a tax deduction, while homeowners cannot. This tax advantage subsidizes investors.

=== Life insurance ===
In the United States life insurance policies also have tax advantages. Income can grow in a life insurance policy that is tax deferred or tax-free. Additionally, there are certain advantages within certain life insurance policies that are excluded from estate and/or inheritance taxes.

=== Investments ===
==== Government bonds ====
In the United States, many government bonds (such as state bonds or municipal bonds) may also be exempt from certain taxes.

==== Investments in partnerships ====
Additionally, investments in partnerships and limited liability companies (LLCs) also have tax advantages. For individual owners of businesses, the LLC is taxed as a sole proprietorship. This means that the entity is not taxed, but the income earned by the entity is taxed to the owner. The LLC has important tax advantages, such as the owners profits potentially being taxed at the owners lower marginal tax bracket. Furthermore, losses can offset the sole proprietor's non-business income. If there are multiple owners of a Limited Liability Company, there is also tax advantages associated with it. They can choose to be taxed as a partnership, but they can also decide to be taxed as a corporate-entity. Partnerships are not taxed, but corporations are. For LLCs taxed as partnerships the income is taxed to the partners. For a corporation or an LLC taxed like a corporation, the entity is subject to tax and dividends on after tax income are also taxed to the shareholders of the corporation or the members of the LLC.

=== Charitable giving ===
To encourage charitable donations from high net-worth individuals, there are tax deductions on charitable donations greater than a specified amount.

== See also ==
- Asset location
- Tax avoidance and tax evasion
