= Generation-skipping transfer tax =

United States tax system for transfers to younger persons

The U.S. generation-skipping transfer tax (a.k.a. "GST tax") imposes a tax on both outright gifts and transfers in trust to or for the benefit of unrelated persons who are more than 37.5 years younger than the donor or to related persons more than one generation younger than the donor, such as grandchildren. These people are known as "skip persons". In most cases where a trust is involved, the GST tax will be imposed only if the transfer avoids incurring a gift or estate tax at each generation level.

Assume, for example, a donor transfers property in a trust for the donor's child and grandchildren and that during the child's lifetime, the trustee may distribute income among the child and grandchildren in accordance with their needs. Assume further that the trust instrument provides that the remaining principal of the trust will be distributed outright to the grandchildren following the child's death. If the trust property is not subject to estate tax at the child's death (by reason of a general power of appointment, e.g.), a GST tax will be imposed when the child dies. This is called a "taxable termination". In that case, the trustee is responsible for filing a GST tax return and paying the tax. On the other hand, a "taxable distribution" occurs if the trustee distributes income or principal to a grandchild before the trust terminates. In that case, the beneficiary is responsible for paying the tax. These taxable events are sometimes overlooked by people who may be unaware of the existence of the tax or its application to their situation. See IRS Forms 706 GS (D-1)) and 706 GS(T).

== 1976 version of the tax ==
The first version of the generation-skipping transfer tax was introduced in 1976. That version attempted to impose a generation-skipping tax exactly equal to the estate or gift tax that was avoided. In the above example, the Executor of the child's Will would have had to determine the estate tax, if any, the child's estate owed without regard to the existence of the trust. Then the Trustee of trust would have to use the child's Federal Estate Tax Return as the basis for recomputing the child's estate tax liability as if the trust property had been part of the child's estate.

== Current version (1986 onward) ==
That approach posed so many administrative problems that in 1986 Congress repealed the 1976 version and enacted a new generation-skipping transfer tax law. The effective date of the current GST tax is October 23, 1986. With few exceptions, the tax only applies to generation-skipping transfers made on or after that date. Irrevocable trusts created before September 25, 1985, are said to be "grandfathered" and exempt from the GST tax.

The most recent version of the generation-skipping transfer tax, applicable to estate or gift transfers through December 31, 2009, did not attempt to impose a tax equal to the estate or gift tax that was avoided. Instead, the generation-skipping tax was imposed at a flat rate equal to the highest marginal estate and gift bracket applicable at the time of the gift, bequest, transfer or termination. In 2009, that rate was 45%. Since 2014, the GST tax rate has remained at a flat 40% of the amount transferred, which is the same as the highest estate and gift tax rate.

In 2009, each taxpayer enjoyed a $3,500,000 exemption from the generation-skipping tax. That meant that only aggregate gifts and bequests to grandchildren or younger beneficiaries (or generation-skipping trusts) in excess of $3,500,000 (potentially $7,000,000 for a married couple acting in concert) would be subject to the GST tax.

In 2010, like the Federal Estate Tax, the generation-skipping transfer tax was briefly repealed. In that year, the GST tax rate was effectively zero. However, the law that created increased exemptions and the ultimate repeal of the GST tax expired on December 31, 2010. In 2016, the exemption was $5.45 million per person.

Starting in 2011, the GST exemption amount for generation-skipping trusts and for outright gifts to skip-persons, is $5 million per person (or $10 million for a married couple). The exemption amount is increased annually by an inflation adjustment as is the estate/gift tax exemption. With the enactment of the Tax Cuts and Jobs Act of 2017, these exemptions were doubled through December 31, 2025. Thus, as of January 1, 2024, the GST exemption amount is $13.61 million per person (inclusive of the inflation adjustment) and twice that for a married couple. However, the increased exemption authorized by the TCJA will sunset on January 1, 2026, unless Congress changes the law. The tax rate remains 40% under current (post-TCJA) law.

== Advantages of using exemptions from the tax ==
Individuals who wish to leave their wealth to their grandchildren may allocate their GST exemption to generation-skipping trusts for their benefit. Such trusts will be funded with cash or property worth up to the available GST exemption. Such trusts that can run for an unlimited term (i.e., those not limited by state laws against perpetuities), are often referred to as dynasty trusts.

Using the generation-skipping tax exemption in this manner offers two important advantages:

- The trust will escape all transfer taxes when the children die and will pass tax-free to the grandchildren.
- The trust may be protected from the claims of creditors and, to some degree, from claims of ex-spouses. Had the trust property been left to the children outright, the property would be subject to such claims.

In some states, property acquired by gift or inheritance from a third party is not subject to division in divorce proceedings and would not be subject to claims by an ex-spouse.

The child may serve as trustee of the trust and hence control trust investment policy. If so, it would be necessary to limit the child's discretionary powers over distributions of income and principal by an "ascertainable standard" in order to avoid subjecting the trust to federal estate taxation at the child's death. Appointing the child as sole trustee may subject the trust to claims of the child's creditors.

== Reform proposals ==
There is support among more liberal politicians, such as Bernie Sanders, to require a GST tax on long-term trusts, after 50 years for example.

== See also ==
- Uniform Gifts to Minors Act
