= Mezzanine capital =

Aspect of finance

Mezzanine capital is a type of financing that sits between senior debt and equity in a company's capital structure. It is typically used to fund growth, acquisitions, or buyouts. Technically, mezzanine capital can be either a debt or equity instrument with a repayment priority between senior debt and common stock equity. Mezzanine debt is subordinated debt that represents a claim on a company's assets which is senior only to that of the common shares and usually unsecured. Redeemable preferred stock equity, with warrants or conversion rights, is also a type of mezzanine financing.

Mezzanine capital is often a more expensive financing source for a company than secured debt or senior debt. The higher cost of capital associated with mezzanine financings is the result of it being an unsecured, subordinated (or junior) obligation in a company's capital structure (i.e., in the event of default, the mezzanine financing is only repaid after all senior obligations have been satisfied). Additionally, mezzanine financings, which are usually private placements, are often used by smaller companies and may involve greater overall levels of leverage than issues in the high-yield market; they thus involve additional risk. In compensation for the increased risk, mezzanine debt holders require a higher return for their investment than secured or more senior lenders.

== Structure ==
Mezzanine financings can be completed through a variety of different structures based on the specific objectives of the transaction and the existing capital structure in place at the company. The basic forms used in most mezzanine financings are subordinated notes and preferred stock. Mezzanine lenders, typically specialist mezzanine investment funds, look for a certain rate of return which can come from securities made up of any of the following or a combination thereof:

- Cash interest: A periodic payment of cash based on a percentage of the outstanding balance of the mezzanine financing. The interest rate can be either fixed throughout the term of the loan or can fluctuate (i.e., float) along with a benchmark rate such as SOFR or other base rates; LIBOR was widely used for this purpose until it was discontinued on 30 June 2023.
- PIK interest: Payable in kind interest is a periodic form of payment in which the interest payment is not paid in cash but rather by increasing the principal amount by the amount of the interest (e.g., a $100 million bond with an 8% PIK interest rate will have a balance of $108 million at the end of the period, but will not pay any cash interest).
- Ownership: Along with the typical interest payment associated with debt, mezzanine capital will often include an equity stake in the form of attached warrants or a conversion feature similar to that of a convertible bond. The ownership component in mezzanine securities is almost always accompanied by either cash interest or PIK interest, and, in many cases, by both.

Mezzanine lenders will also often charge an arrangement fee, payable upfront at the closing of the transaction. Arrangement fees contribute the least return, and their purposes are primarily to cover administrative costs or as an incentive to complete the transaction.

The following are illustrative examples of mezzanine financings:

- $100 million of senior subordinated notes with warrants (10% cash interest, 3% PIK interest and warrants representing 4% of the fully diluted ownership of the company)
- $50 million of redeemable preferred stock with warrants (0% cash interest, 14% PIK interest and warrants representing 6% of the fully diluted ownership of the company)

In structuring a mezzanine security, the company and lender work together to avoid burdening the borrower with the full interest cost of such a loan. Because mezzanine lenders will seek a return of 14% to 20%, this return must be achieved through means other than simple cash interest payments. As a result, by using equity ownership and PIK interest, the mezzanine lender effectively defers its compensation until the due date of the security or a change of control of the company.

Mezzanine financings can be made at either the operating company level or at the level of a holding company (also known as structural subordination). In a holding company structure, as there are no operations and hence no cash flows, the structural subordination of the security and the reliance on cash dividends from the operating company introduces additional risk and typically higher cost.

== Uses ==
=== Leveraged buyouts ===
In leveraged buyouts, mezzanine capital is used in conjunction with other securities to fund the purchase price of the company being acquired. Typically, mezzanine capital will be used to fill a financing gap between less expensive forms of financing (e.g., senior loans, second lien loan, high yield financings) and equity. Often, a financial sponsor will exhaust other sources of capital before turning to mezzanine capital.

Financial sponsors will seek to use mezzanine capital in a leveraged buyout in order to reduce the amount of the capital invested by the private equity firm; because mezzanine lenders typically have a lower target cost of capital than the private equity investor, using mezzanine capital can potentially enhance the private equity firm's investment returns. Additionally, middle market companies may be unable to access the high yield market due to high minimum size requirements, creating a need for flexible, private mezzanine capital.

=== Real estate finance ===
In real estate finance, mezzanine loans are often used by developers to secure supplementary financing for development projects (typically in cases where the primary mortgage or construction loan equity requirements are larger than 10%). These sorts of mezzanine loans are often secured by a second ranking real property mortgage (that is, ranking subordinate to the first mortgage lenders). Standard mortgage foreclosure proceedings can take more than a year, depending upon the relationship between the first mortgage lenders and the mezzanine debt lender, governed by an Intercreditor Deed.

== See also ==
- Growth capital
- History of private equity and venture capital
- Hybrid security
- Private equity
- Private equity secondary market
