= PIK loan =

Type of high-risk loan

A PIK, or payment in kind, is a type of high-risk loan or bond that allows borrowers to pay interest with additional debt, rather than cash. That makes it an expensive, high-risk financing instrument since the size of the debt may increase quickly, leaving lenders with big losses if the borrower is unable to pay back the loan.

== Types ==
There are three types of PIKs, which are characterized by differences in interest repayment.

=== True PIKs ===
True PIKs, also known as "mandatory" PIKs, establish the interest payment structure at the time of issuance. That is to say, there is "no variation from period to period other than as scheduled at the time of issuance". Interest is required to be paid solely in kind or through a combination of cash and in kind interest, and may shift to all cash at a given point in time, but all of this is predetermined and agreed upon at issuance.

=== PIK toggles ===
PIK toggles, also known as "pay if you want", are slightly less risky than PIKs, as borrowers pay interest in cash and may "toggle" to payment in kind at the discretion of the borrower ("pay if you want"). Sometimes, the borrower may also be able to PIK some portion of the interest (usually half) while paying the rest in cash; at times, only some of the interest may be paid in kind and the rest is cash-only. This also benefits borrowers, as they may opt for early payment of interest in cash, thereby minimizing the compounded payout at maturity. The documentation often provides that if the PIK feature is activated, the interest rate is increased by 25, 50, or 75 basis points.

The first company to try a PIK toggle was Neiman Marcus in late 2005.

=== Contingent PIK toggles ===
This is a different type of PIK toggle, also known as "contingent cash pay" or "pay if you can", where borrowers pay interest in cash and only "toggle" to payment in kind under certain conditions; for example, if there is insufficient cash, usually determined by a cash flow trigger.

== Uses ==
PIKs are primarily used for leveraged buyouts, dividend recapitalizations, and, more rarely, to finance acquisitions.

=== Leveraged buyouts ===
In leveraged buyouts, PIKs are used if the purchase price of the target exceeds leverage levels up to which lenders are willing to provide a senior loan, a second lien loan, or a mezzanine loan, or if there is no cash flow available to service a loan (e.g., due to dividend or merger restrictions). It is typically provided to the acquisition vehicle, either another company or a special purpose entity (SPE), and not to the target itself.

PIKs in leveraged buyouts typically carry a substantially higher interest and fee burden compared to senior loans, second lien loans, and mezzanine loans of the same transaction. With yield exceeding 20% per annum, the acquirer has to be very diligent in assessing whether the cost of a PIK does not exceed the internal rate of return of equity investment.

Before the 2008 financial crisis, several leveraged buyouts have seen some secured second-lien term bank loans coming with PIK or, more frequently, PIK toggle features, in order to support the firm's ability to cover cash interest during the initial period after the leveraged buyouts. If the acquired company performs well, the PIK toggle feature allows the equity sponsor to avoid giving extraordinary returns to the PIK debt, which might happen if the debt were strictly PIK. The PIK toggle largely disappeared in the wake of the credit crunch, though in early 2013 there were signs of a tentative comeback. Towards mid-2013, PIK toggle loans returned in force as the high-yield bond market in the United States and, to some degree, Europe shifted into high gear.

=== Other examples ===
One high-profile use of PIKs involved the controversial takeover of Manchester United Football Club by Malcolm Glazer in 2005. Glazer used PIK loans, which were sold to hedge funds, to fund the takeover, much to the displeasure of many of the club's supporters, because the burden of the debt was placed on the club itself, not the Glazers.

In January 2018, Irish entrepreneur Paul Coulson used a $350 million PIK bond to pay a dividend to a group of shareholders at the Ardagh Group, for which Coulson is the largest shareholder and chairman. The Financial Times interpreted the use of a high-risk PIK bond to be indicative of "the level of risk that debt investors are willing to tolerate as they seek higher yields in hot credit markets". This was unusual because the PIK was raised by a newly formed holding company, with analysts and investors referring to the novel structure as a "SuperHoldCo PIK note" or "super PIK".

== Return and interest ==
PIKs are typically unsecured (i.e., not backed by a pledge of assets as collateral) and/or are characterized by a deeply subordinated security structure (e.g., third lien). Maturities usually exceed five years and the PIK usually carries a detachable warrant—the right to purchase a certain number of shares of stock or bonds at a given price for a certain period of time—or another mechanism that allow the lender to share in the future success of the business. This makes it a hybrid security.

PIK lenders, typically special funds, look for a certain minimum internal rate of return, which can come from three major sources: arrangement fees, PIKs, and warrants (there are also minor sources, like ticking fees). The arrangement fee, which is usually payable up-front, contributes the least return and serves to cover administrative costs. PIKs accrue interest period after period, thus increasing the underlying principal (i.e., compound interest). The achieved selling price of the shares acquired under the warrant is also a part of the total return of the lender. Typically, refinancing PIK loans in the first years is either completely restricted or comes at a high premium (i.e. prepayment protection) to meet the internal requirements of investing funds.

Interest on PIKs is substantially higher than debt of higher priority, thus making the compound interest the dominating part of the repayable principal. In addition, PIK loans typically carry substantial refinancing risk, meaning that the cash flow of the borrower in the repayment period will usually not suffice to repay all monies owed if the company does not perform excellently. By that definition, PIK lenders prefer borrowers with strong growth potential. Because of the flexibility of the loan, there are basically no limits to structures and borrowers. Plus, in most jurisdictions the accruing interest is tax deductible, providing the borrower with a substantial tax shield.

== See also ==
- Negative amortization, a similar arrangement in mortgage loans
- Zero-coupon bond
- Margin loan
- In kind
