= Secured loan =

Type of loan with collateral pledged

A secured loan is a loan in which the borrower pledges some asset (e.g. a car or property) as collateral for the loan, which then becomes a secured debt owed to the creditor who gives the loan. The debt is thus secured against the collateral, and if the borrower defaults, the creditor takes possession of the asset used as collateral and may sell it to regain some or all of the amount originally loaned to the borrower. An example is the foreclosure of a home. From the creditor's perspective, that is a category of debt in which a lender has been granted a portion of the bundle of rights to specified property. If the sale of the collateral does not raise enough money to pay off the debt, the creditor can often obtain a deficiency judgment against the borrower for the remaining amount.

The opposite of secured debt/loan is unsecured debt, which is not connected to any specific piece of property. Instead, the creditor may satisfy the debt only against the borrower, rather than the borrower's collateral and the borrower. Generally speaking, secured debt may attract lower interest rates than unsecured debt because of the added security for the lender; however, credit risk (e.g. credit history, and ability to repay) and expected returns for the lender are also factors affecting rates. The term secured loan is used in the United Kingdom, but the United States more commonly uses secured debt.

== Purpose ==
There are two purposes for a loan secured by debt. In the first purpose, by extending the loan through securing the debt, the creditor is relieved of most of the financial risks involved because it allows the creditor to take ownership of the property in the event that the debt is not properly repaid. In exchange, this permits the second purpose where the debtors may receive loans on more favorable terms than that available for unsecured debt, or to be extended credit under circumstances when credit under terms of unsecured debt would not be extended at all. The creditor may offer a loan with attractive interest rates and repayment periods for the secured debt.

== Types ==
- A mortgage loan is a secured loan in which the collateral is property, such as a home.
- A nonrecourse loan is a secured loan where the collateral is the only security or claim the creditor has against the borrower, and the creditor has no further recourse against the borrower for any deficiency remaining after foreclosure against the property.
- A foreclosure is a legal process in which mortgaged property is sold to pay the debt of the defaulting borrower.
- A repossession is a process in which property, such as a car, is taken back by the creditor when the borrower does not make payments due on the property. Depending on the jurisdiction, it may or may not require a court order.

== UK secured loan market ==
Before the global economic crisis of 2006, the Financial Services Authority (FSA) estimated that the UK secured loan market had a net worth of £7,000,000,000. However, following the close of Lehman Brothers' sub-prime lender BNC Mortgage in August 2007, the UK's most prominent secured loan providers were forced to withdraw from the market.

== UK secured loan market timeline (following the global credit crisis) ==
- August 2007: Lehman Brothers closes its sub-prime lender, BNC Mortgage.
- September 2007: Southern Pacific Personal Loans and London Mortgage Company close down. Kensington Mortgages withdraws from the secured loan market a day later.
- October 2007: White Label Loans launches to fill the gap left by Southern Pacific Personal Loans, Kensington Personal Loans and Money Partners. Product launch is piloted by Beech Finance Ltd. and Specialist Financial Services Ltd.
- April 2008: London Scottish Bank closes down entire lending division.
- May 2008: Future Mortgages announce they will close for business.
- June 2008: Picture Financial ceases to trade in the sector.
- July 2008: Barclays ceases to sell secured loans through FirstPlus.
- September 2008: Lehman Brothers declares bankruptcy.
- November 2008: Bank of America subsidiary Loans.co.uk ceases to trade.
- December 2008: West Bromwich Building Society subsidiary White Label Loans closes its doors to new business just fourteen months after launching and completing £60,000,000 of secured loans.
- August 2009: The Finance & Leasing Association (FLA) reports that secured loan lending has fallen 84% since 2008.
- October 2010: MP George Justice drafts Secured Lending Reform Bill.
- December 2010: The Finance & Leasing Association (FLA) reveal secured loan lending sank to £16m.
- October 2011: Whiteaway Laidlaw Bank combine with Commercial First and Link Loans to create new lender, Shawbrook Bank.
- February 2012: Specialist lender Equifinance enters the market.
- May 2012: Secured Lending Reform Bill fails to pass through Parliament.
- July 2012: UK's first Secured Loan Index is launched by secured loan broker, Loans Warehouse, and reveals secured lending in the UK reached £150m in the first half of 2012.
- September 2012: Secured loan lending is now worth £350,000,000.
- December 2012: Secured Loan lender Nemo Personal Finance launches the secured loan market's lowest ever interest rates of 5.592% per annum for employed applicants and 6.54% per annum for self-employed applicants.
- February 2013: Shawbrook Bank launches a secured loan product that allows loans up to 95% of property value.
- 1 April 2014: the Financial Conduct Authority took over formal regulation of the consumer credit market which included secured loans. Previous to this, secured loans fell under the remit of the Office of Fair Trading and firms issuing and brokering secured loans required no authorisation from the FCA. The FCA's involvement dramatically changed the secured loan landscape by putting into place more protection for the consumer.
- 21 March 2016: the FCA introduced The Mortgage Credit Directive which meant all regulated first-charge and second-charge mortgage contracts are treated in exactly the same way. The MCD was set up to protect consumers by governing first- and second-charge mortgage markets (as well as consumer buy-to-lets) under the same regulation, and to provide a harmonised approach to mortgage regulation across the EU. Following the introduction of the MCD mortgage brokers and advisers were required to inform their clients that a second-charge mortgage could be a better alternative to a remortgage or further advance.
- 2017 - 2019: Following the implementation of MCD (see 21 March 2016 timeline point) - the secured loan market saw steady growth in activity and consumer demand. At the end of 2019, the 12 month growth trend (as evidenced by the Finance and Leasing association's market statistics) showed a 20% annual growth rate.
- 2020 - 2021: COVID-19 had a significant impact on the secured loan market. Due to the uncertainty created by the global Coronavirus pandemic, many second charge mortgage providers paused lending. Those that continued to lend made adjustments to lending criteria to reduce credit risk . In any case, consumer demand for borrowing on a secured loan also reduced due to the economic uncertainty as a result of the pandemic. The lows of the secured loans market were reached in 2020, and 2021 showed gradual improvement as the number of new loan agreements issued increased from 486 in May 2020, to 1,910 in May 2021 (although some way short of the 2,657 of new loans issued in October 2019)
- 2022: After what was an uncertain period of activity for the UK secured loans market, 2022 showed not only recovery post the global Coronavirus pandemic, but significant growth vs activities before the pandemic. Whilst the UK began to see much higher rates of inflation than it had seen for a number of years, the Bank of England base rate had been increased significantly, and the UK housing market started to slow - all of which could be considered negatives - they combined to create an environment where demand and interest in secured loans increased vs earlier years. This resulted in a 52% increase in new secured loan agreements for the 12 month period ending 30th June 2022.

== United States law ==
The United States is a global leader in security interest law with respect to personal property; in the 1940s, it was the first country to develop and enact the notion of a "unified" security interest. That concept has since spread to many countries around the world. For example, to raise money, American ranchers could pledge personal property like cattle in certain ways that historically were impossible or very difficult in Uruguay or most other developing countries.

In the case of real estate, the most common form of secured debt is the lien. Liens may either be consensual or non-consensual. Examples of consensual liens include a mortgage or a fixture filing, and examples of non-consensual liens include a Federal or State tax lien or a mechanics lien. A mortgage may only be created with the express consent of the title owner, without regard to other facts of the situation. In contrast, the primary condition required to create a mechanics lien is that real estate is somehow improved through the work or materials provided by the person filing a mechanics lien. Although the rules are complex, consent of the title owner to the mechanics lien itself is not required.

In the case of personal property, the most common procedure for securing the debt is regulated under Article 9 of the Uniform Commercial Code (UCC). This uniform act provides a relatively uniform interstate system of forms and public filing of documents by which the creditor establishes the priority of their security interest in the property of the debtor.

In the event that the underlying debt is not properly paid, the creditor may decide to foreclose the interest in order to take the property. Generally, the law that allows the secured debt to be made also provides a procedure whereby the property will be sold at public auction, or through some other means of sale. The law commonly also provides a right of redemption, whereby a debtor may arrange for late payment of the debt but keep the property.

=== How secured debt is created ===
Debt can become secured by a contractual agreement, statutory lien, or judgment lien. Contractual agreements can be secured by either a purchase money security interest (PMSI) loan, where the creditor takes a security interest in the items purchased (i.e. vehicle, furniture, electronics); or, a non-purchase money security interest (NPMSI) loan, where the creditor takes a security interest in items that the debtor already owns.

== See also ==
- Bankruptcy
- Capital structure
- Debt arbitration
- Loan guarantee
- Second lien loan
- Seniority (financial)
- Senior debt
- Subordinated debt
- Title loan
- Unsecured debt
