= Perpetual bond =

Financial bond with no maturity date

A perpetual bond, also known colloquially as a perpetual or perp, is a bond with no maturity date, therefore allowing it to be treated as equity, not as debt. Issuers pay coupons on perpetual bonds forever, and they do not have to redeem the principal. Perpetual bond cash flows are, therefore, those of a perpetuity.

== Perpetual bonds vs. equity ==
- Although similar to equity, perpetual bonds do not have attached votes and, therefore, provide no means of control over the issuer.
- Perpetual bonds are still fixed-income securities; therefore, paying coupons is mandatory whereas paying dividends on equity is discretionary.

== Examples ==
Russian perpetual debt certificate for 500 silver rubles, issued in 1847, paying 5% annual interest.

- Consols that were issued by the United States and the UK governments.
- War bonds issued by a number of governments to finance war efforts in the first and second world wars.
- The oldest example of a perpetual bond was issued on 15 May 1624 by the Dutch water board of Lekdijk Bovendams and sold to Elsken Jorisdochter. Only about five such bonds from the Dutch Golden Age are known to survive by 2023. Another of these bonds, issued in 1648, is currently in the possession of Yale University. Yale bought the document for its history of finance archive at auction in 2003, at which time no interest had been paid on it since 1977. Yale Professor Geert Rouwenhorst travelled in person to the Netherlands to collect the interest due. Interest continues to accumulate on this bond, and was most recently paid in 2015 by the eventual successor of Lekdijk Bovendams (Hoogheemraadschap De Stichtse Rijnlanden). Originally issued with a principal of "1000 silver Carolus gulders of 20 Stuivers a piece", as of 2004 the yearly interest payment to the bondholder is set at €11.35. According to its original terms, the bond would pay 5% interest in perpetuity, although the interest rate was reduced to 3.5% and then 2.5% during the 18th century.
- Most perpetual bonds issued in the present day are deeply subordinated bonds issued by banks. The bonds are counted as Tier 1 capital and help the banks fulfill their capital requirements. Most of these bonds are callable, but the first call date is never less than five years from the date of issue—a call protection period.

== Pricing ==
Perpetual bonds are valued using the formula:

$$\text{Price} = \frac{I}{y}$$

where:

- $I$ is an annual coupon interest on a bond.
- $y$ is an expected yield for maximum term available.

== See also ==
- Bond market
- Debt securities
- Fixed income
- Government bond
- Perpetual subordinated debt
- Subordinated debt
- War bond
