= Second lien loan =

Type of obligation to pay money

The vast majority of all second lien loans are senior secured obligations of the borrower. Second lien loans differ from both unsecured debt and subordinated debt.

== First lien secured loans ==
In the event of a bankruptcy or liquidation, the assets used by the company as security would first be provided to the first lien secured lenders as repayment of their borrowings. To the extent that the value of the assets is sufficient to satisfy the company's obligations to the first lien secured lenders, any additional proceeds from the sale of the pledged assets would then be made available to the second lien lenders as repayment of the second lien loan.

With almost no exceptions, a borrower will take a second lien loan either at the same time or after taking a traditional first lien secured loan and the secured lenders will place limitations on the borrower's ability to pledge its assets or borrow additional secured debt.

The specific rights of the first lien and second lien lenders are established in the credit agreements between the borrower and each class of lender as well as in an intercreditor agreement. An intercreditor agreement is a contract between multiple classes of lenders where each class of lender agrees to specific procedures and preferences in the event of a bankruptcy or liquidation. Secured lenders will routinely require an intercreditor agreement to protect their interests before allowing a borrower to obtain a second lien loan.

== Unsecured debt ==
Unlike unsecured debt, second lien loans receive a pledge of specific assets of the borrower (e.g., buildings, land, equipment, intellectual property, receivables and other financial assets).

== Subordinated debt ==
Subordinated debt refers to a class of obligations that are contractually subordinated in ranking to all of the senior obligations (i.e., general non-subordinated obligations) of the company, whether they are secured or unsecured. Although the second lien loan's security interest is subordinated to the first lien loan's interest in the pledged assets of the company, the ranking of first lien and second lien loans are the same in the event the pledged assets are not sufficient to satisfy the outstanding borrowings. In the event of a liquidation of a company, both the first lien and second lien loans would likely be repaid in full (along with trade and other general creditors) before the subordinated lenders receive any repayment of their obligations.

== Application in leveraged buyouts ==
Second lien loans are used in leveraged buyouts to fill small gaps between the financing needs of the borrower and maximum thresholds (measured by various leverage metrics) of senior secured lenders. The arrangement fee and interest (finance) of a second lien loan are higher than those of the first lien secured loan of the same borrower because of increased risk for the lender that comes from a subordinated security interest. However, second lien debt can often reduce the overall cost of capital in a leveraged buyout transaction, replacing other more expensive forms of financing (e.g., senior unsecured debt).

== See also ==
- Negative pledge
- Pari passu
- Preferential creditor
- Seniority (finance)
- Senior debt
- Security interest
- Secured creditor
- Subordinated debt
- Unsecured creditor
