= Depositories Act, 1996 =

Parliament of India
- Long title: An Act to provide for regulation of depositories in securities and for matters connected therewith or incidental thereto.
- Citation: Act No. 22 of 1996
- Territorial extent: India
- Passed by: Lok Sabha
- Passed: 16 July 1996
- Passed by: Rajya Sabha
- Passed: 23 July 1996
- Assented to by: President
- Assented to: 10 August 1996
- Effective: 20 September 1995

Legislative history

Initiating chamber: Lok Sabha
- Bill title: Depositories Bill, 1996
- Introduced: 11 July 1996
- Passed: 16 July 1996

Revising chamber: Rajya Sabha
- Passed: 23 July 1996

Repeals
- Depositories (Third) Ordinance, 1996

Amended by
- Depositories Related Laws (Amendment) Act, 1997; Securities Laws (Second Amendment) Act, 1999; Repealing and Amending Act, 2001; Securities Laws (Amendment) Act, 2004; Securities Laws (Amendment) Act, 2014; Enforcement of Security Interest and Recovery of Debts Laws and Miscellaneous Provisions (Amendment) Act, 2016; Finance Act, 2017; Finance Act, 2018; International Financial Services Centres Authority Act, 2019

Related legislation
- Bankers' Books Evidence Act, 1891; Income-tax Act, 1961
- Status: In force (amended)

The Depositories Act, 1996 (Act No. 22 of 1996) is an act of the Parliament of India. It provides the legal framework for the regulation of depositories in India, which hold securities in dematerialized (electronic) form, and for matters related to them.

It aims to simplify securities ownership transfer, reduce paperwork, and enhance transparency and investor trust in the securities market.

== Amendments ==
It is amended by various acts over the years, which includes the following:

Amending Act	Amendment
Depositories Related Laws (Amendment) Act, 1997	substituted sub-section 2 of sec. 9
Securities Laws (Second Amendment) Act, 1999	definition for “Securities Appellate Tribunal”, amendment in sec. 23, inserted sec. 23A
Repealing and Amending Act, 2001	Rep. sec. 30 and sched.
Securities Laws (Amendment) Act, 2004	
Securities Laws (Amendment) Act, 2014	
Enforcement of Security Interest and Recovery of Debts Laws and Miscellaneous Provisions (Amendment) Act, 2016	
Finance Act, 2017	
Finance Act, 2018	
International Financial Services Centres Authority Act, 2019	
