= Elsken Jorisdochter =

Elsken Jorisdochter was a 17th-century Dutch woman who holds the record for the oldest bonds ever traded in North America. The bonds purchased by her were still paying interest at the rate of 2.5% in the early twenty-first century.

== Biography ==
In 1624, Elsken Jorisdochter had spent 1200 florins to invest in bonds issued by the Lekdijk Bovendams Company. The bonds were issued for the purpose of carrying out repairs to the dikes and offered an initial interest rate of 6.25%.

Three centuries later, in 1957, the bonds purchased by Elsken Jorisdochter were still paying interest.

In 1938, the heirs of Elsken Jorisdochter presented the bonds for payment to the New York Stock Exchange.

== Commentary ==
The bonds purchased by Elsken Jorisdochter are said to be the oldest bonds ever traded in North America, although they are not the oldest in the world.

The author William J. Bernstein in his seminal 2004 book The Birth of Plenty has praised the virtues of investing in bonds by offering the example of Elsken Jorisdochter:

The Dutch do not take the word perpetuity lightly: In 1624 a woman by the name of Elsken Jorisdochter invested 1,200 florins in a bond used to finance dike repair paying 6.25%. It was free of all taxes, similar to a modern municipal bond. Handed down to her descendants, about a century later the rate was negotiated down to 2.5%. In 1938, it came into the hands of the New York Stock Exchange, and as late as 1957 it was still being presented for payment of interest at Utrecht.

The example of Elsken Jorisdochter is also mentioned by authors Sidney Homer and Richard Sylla in their book A History of Interest Rates.
