= Hypotheca =

Hypotheca may refer to:

- The inner theca of the frustule (exoskeleton) of a diatom
- Hypothec, in civil law, a sort of mortgage
