= Hypothec =

Legal right over a debtor's property in civil law systems

Hypothec (/haɪˈpɒθɪk, ˈhaɪpɒθ-/; from Lat. hypotheca, from Gk. ὑποθήκη: hypothēkē), sometimes tacit hypothec, is a term used in civil law systems (e.g. the law of most of Continental Europe) to refer to a registered real security of a creditor over real estate, but under some jurisdictions it may additionally cover ships only (ship hypothec), as opposed to other collaterals, including corporeal movables other than ships, securities or intangible assets such as intellectual property rights, covered by a different type of right (pledge). Common law has two main equivalents to the term: mortgages and non-possessory lien.

== Overview ==
This real right in security operates by way of hypothecation. It may arise only through being entered into the land and hypothec register or the ship registry, as a result of:

- a hypothecary loan contract, required in the form of a notarial act - in case of a contractual hypothec
- an administrative or court decision - in case of a compulsory hypothec

Hypothec gives a creditor a preferential right to have claims paid out of the hypothecated property as last recourse when the debtor is in default. In the hypothec, the property does not pass to the creditor, but they acquire a preferential right to have their debt paid out of the hypothecated property; that is, they can sell it and pay themself out of the proceeds, or in default of a purchaser they can become the owner themself.

== History ==
Originating in Roman law, a hypotheca was essentially a non-possessory pledge over a person's entire estate, but during the Renaissance the device was revived by civil law legal systems as a hypothecatory security interest taken strictly over immovable property and, like the late medieval obligatio bonorum, running with the land (Latin jus persequendi.

== Hypothecation and rehypothecation ==
Hypothecation is the practice where a debtor pledges collateral to secure a debt or as a condition precedent to the debt, or a third party pledges collateral for the debtor. A common example occurs when a debtor enters into a hypothecary loan agreement, in which the debtor's house becomes collateral until the hypothecary loan is paid off. The debtor retains ownership of the collateral, but the creditor has the right to seize ownership if the debtor defaults. The main purpose of hypothecation is to mitigate the creditor's credit risk. If the debtor cannot pay, the creditor possesses the collateral and therefore can claim its ownership, sell it and thus compensate the lacking cash inflows. In a default of the obligor without previous hypothecation, the creditor cannot be sure that it can seize sufficient assets of the debtor. Because hypothecation makes it easier to get the debt and potentially decreases its price; the debtor wants to hypothecate as much debt as possible – but the isolation of 'good assets' for the collateral reduces the quality of the rest of the debtor's balance sheet and thus its credit worthiness. The detailed practice and rules regulatory hypothecation vary depending on context and on the jurisdiction where it takes place. Hypothecation is a common feature of consumer contracts involving mortgages – the debtor legally owns the house, but until the mortgage is paid off, the creditor has the right to take ownership (and possibly also possession) – but only if the debtor fails to keep up with repayments. If a consumer takes out an additional loan secured against the value of his hypothec (known colloquially as a "second hypothec", for up to approximately the current value of the house minus outstanding repayments) the consumer is then hypothecating the hypothec itself – the creditor can still seize the house but in this case the creditor then becomes responsible for the outstanding hypothecary debt. Sometimes consumer goods and business equipment can be bought on credit agreements involving hypothecation – the goods are legally owned by the borrower, but once again the creditor can seize them if required.

Rehypothecation occurs when entities re-use the collateral to secure their own borrowing. For the creditor the collateral not only mitigates the credit risk but also allows refinancing more easily or at lower rates; in an initial hypothecation contract, however, the debtor can restrict such re-use of the collateral.

== Hypothec in mixed legal systems ==
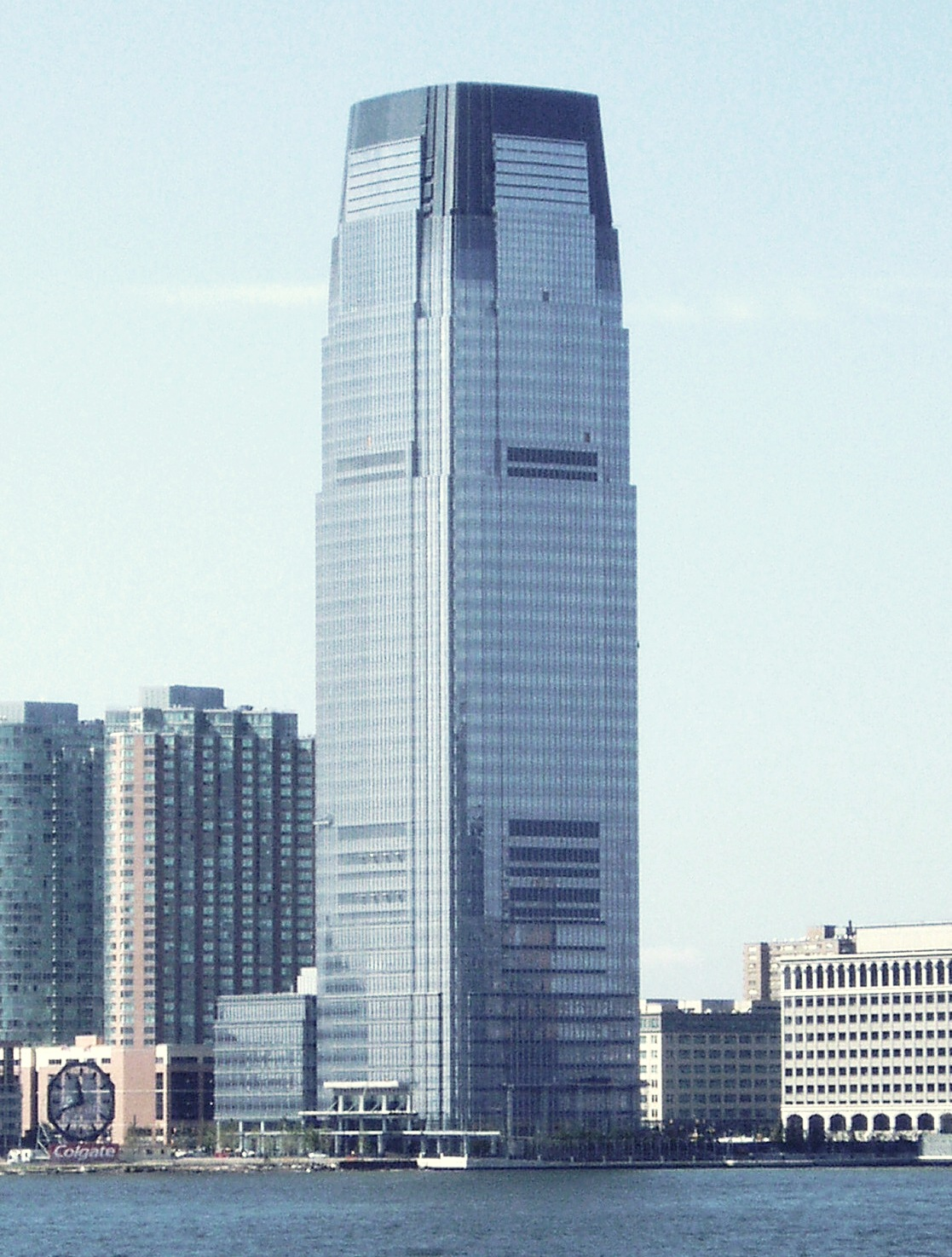
Goldman Sachs Tower – banks that provide prime brokerage services are able to expand their trading operations by re-using collateral belonging to their counter-parties.

Under a handful of mixed legal systems, the hypothec was imported as a non-possessory real security over movable property (in opposition to the common-law chattel mortgage). In the mixed legal systems of some other countries (e.g. Scots law, South African law) it may cover any corporeal movables, securities or intangible assets. Whereas a pledge operates by bailment and transfers possession on delivery and a chattel mortgage operates by conveyance and transfers title, a hypothec operates by hypothecation and transfers neither possession nor title. The name and the principle have passed into Scotland's civil law system, which distinguishes between conventional hypothecs, as bottomry and respondentia, and tacit hypothecs established by law. Of the latter the most important is the landlord's hypothec for rent (corresponding to distress in the law of England), which extends over the produce of the land and the cattle and sheep fed on it, and over stock and horses used in husbandry. In the US, the legal right for the creditor to take ownership of the collateral if the debtor defaults is classified as a lien.

The most common form of hypothecation is a repo transaction: the creditor gives a loan to the debtor and receives in return the possession (not the ownership) of a financial asset until the maturity of the loan. A reverse repo is a hypothecation 'in the reverse direction': creditor and debtor swap roles. When an investor asks a broker to purchase securities on margin, hypothecation can occur in two senses. First, the purchased assets can be hypothecated so that, if the investor fails to keep up credit repayments, the broker can sell some of the securities; the broker can also sell the securities if they drop in value and the investor fails to respond to a margin call. The second sense is that the original deposit the investor puts down for the margin account can itself be in the form of securities rather than a cash deposit, and again the securities belong to the investor but can be sold by the creditor in the case of a default. In both cases, unlike with consumer or business finance, the borrower does not typically have possession of the securities as they will be in accounts controlled by the broker, however, the borrower does still retain legal ownership.

Rehypothecation can also be involved in repurchase agreements, commonly called repos. In a two-party repurchase agreement, one party sells to the other a security at a price with a commitment to buy the security back at a later date for another price. Overnight repurchase agreements, the most commonly used form of this arrangement, comprise a sale which takes place the first day and a repurchase that reverses the transaction the next day. Term repurchase agreements, less commonly used, extend for a fixed period of time that may be as long as three months. Open-ended term repurchase agreements are also possible. A so-called reverse repo is not actually any different from a repo; it merely describes the opposite side of the transaction. The seller of the security who later repurchases it is entering into a repurchase agreement; the purchaser who later re-sells the security enters into a reverse repurchase agreement. Notwithstanding its nominal form as a sale and subsequent repurchase of a security, the economic effect of a repurchase agreement is that of a secured loan.

Re-hypothecation occurs mainly in the financial markets when the creditor (a bank or other financial institution) re-uses the collateral posted by the debtor (a client such as a hedge fund) to back the broker's own trades and borrowing. This mechanism also enables leverage in the securities market. In the UK, there is no limit on the amount of a client's assets that can be rehypothecated, (Note: Though of course a bank can only rehypothecate the assets the client has posted as collateral.) except if the client has negotiated an agreement with their broker that includes a limit or prohibition. In the US, re-hypothecation is capped at 140% of a client's debit balance. (Note: Hedge funds often have a considerably higher amount of securities pledged as collateral than their current borrowings – they continue to receive the normal income stream from the securities and it gives them the flexibility to quickly execute trades if an opportunity arises – the 140% limit does in many cases considerably reduce their exposure to rehypothecation.) In 2007, rehypothecation accounted for half the activity in the shadow banking system. Because the collateral is not cash it does not show up on conventional balance sheet accounting. Before the Lehman collapse, the International Monetary Fund (IMF) calculated that US banks were receiving over $4 trillion worth of funding by rehypothecation, much of it sourced from the UK where there are no statutory limits governing the reuse of a client's collateral. It is estimated that only $1 trillion of original collateral was being used, meaning that collateral was being rehypothecated several times over, with an estimated churn factor of 4. Following the Lehman collapse, large hedge funds in particular became more wary of allowing their collateral to be rehypothecated, and even in the UK they would insist on contracts that limit the amount of their assets that can be reposted, or even prohibit rehypothecation completely. In 2009 the IMF estimated that the funds available to US banks due to rehypothecation had declined by more than half to $2.1 trillion – due to both less original collateral being available for rehypothecation in the first place and a lower churn factor. The possible role of rehypothecation in the 2008 financial crisis and in the shadow banking system was largely overlooked by the mainstream financial press, until Dr. Gillian Tett of the Financial Times drew attention in August 2010 to a paper from Manmohan Singh and James Aitken of the International Monetary Fund which examined the issue.

=== By jurisdiction ===
==== Scotland ====
Hypothec Amendment (Scotland) Act 1867 (Note: Section 1.)
- Act of Parliament
- Parliament of the United Kingdom
- Long title: An Act to amend the Law relating to the Landlord’s Right of Hypothec in Scotland, in so far as respects Land held for Agricultural or Grazing Purposes.
- Citation: 30 & 31 Vict. c. 42
- Territorial extent: Scotland

Dates
- Royal assent: 15 July 1867
- Commencement: 15 July 1867 (Note: The Acts of Parliament (Commencement) Act 1793.)
- Repealed: 1 April 2008 (Note: The Bankruptcy and Diligence etc. (Scotland) Act 2007 (Commencement No. 9 and Savings Amendment) Order 2014 (SSI 2014/173).)
Other legislation
Amended by	Decimal Currency Act 1969
Repealed by	Bankruptcy and Diligence etc. (Scotland) Act 2007

Status: Repealed

Text of statute as originally enacted

Revised text of statute as amended

Hypothec Abolition (Scotland) Act 1880 (Note: Section 4.)
- Act of Parliament
- Parliament of the United Kingdom
- Long title: An Act to abolish the Landlord’s Right of Hypothec for Rent in Scotland.
- Citation: 43 Vict. c. 12
- Territorial extent: United Kingdom

Dates
- Royal assent: 24 March 1880
- Commencement: 11 November 1880
- Repealed: 1 April 2008
Other legislation
Amended by	Agricultural Holdings (Scotland) Act 1883
Repealed by	Bankruptcy and Diligence etc. (Scotland) Act 2007

Status: Repealed

Text of statute as originally enacted

Revised text of statute as amended

The law of agricultural hypothec long caused much discontent in Scotland; its operation was restricted by the Hypothec Amendment (Scotland) Act 1867 (30 & 31 Vict. c. 42), and by the Hypothec Abolition (Scotland) Act 1880 (43 Vict. c. 12) it was enacted that the landlord's right of hypothec for the rent of land, including the rent of any buildings thereon, exceeding two acres (8,000 m^{2}) in extent, let for agriculture or pasture, shall cease and determine. By the same act and by the Agricultural Holdings (Scotland) Act 1883 (46 & 47 Vict. c. 62) other rights and remedies for rent, where the right of hypothec had ceased, were given to the landlord.

Under Scots law, landlord's hypothec is a common law right of security enjoyed by landlords over any goods sited on the leased premises, regardless of who owns those goods. The hypothec does not secure all sums which happen to be due to the landlord, only a portion of the rent. Landlord's hypothec is enforced by court proceedings known as sequestration for rent. The Bankruptcy and Diligence etc. (Scotland) Act 2007 (asp 3) abolishes the common law diligence of sequestration for rent.

The Scottish Executive felt that such a mechanism had no part to play in a modern enforcement system, not least because a landlord is able to use other diligences to recover unpaid rent, such as attachment sequestration for rent can now be used to sell only goods that are secured by a right known as the landlord's hypothec, which arises automatically whenever there is a qualifying lease.

The act makes some changes to the hypothec, even though it is not a diligence. For example, it completes the process of abolishing the hypothec over goods in dwelling-houses that was initiated by the Debt Arrangement and Attachment (Scotland) Act 2002 (section 208(3) of the 2007 act). It also abolishes the hypothec over goods owned by a third party (section 208(4)).

The act also states that, notwithstanding the abolition of sequestration for rent, landlord's hypothec does continue as a right in security (section 208(2)(a)).

==== Quebec ====
In Quebec law, the word is nevertheless used in translations as an equivalent of hypothèque, which has a much broader meaning and encompasses the common law equivalents of, inter alia, mortgages, non-possessory liens over movables or immovables, and legal or equitable charges. Thus, art. 2660 of the Quebec Civil Code defines hypothec, providing as follows:

A hypothec is a real right on movable or immovable property made liable for the performance of an obligation. It confers on the creditor the right to follow the property into whomsoever's hands it may come, to take possession of it, to take it in payment, to sell it or to cause it to be sold and thus to have a preference upon the proceeds of the sale, according to the rank as determined in this Code.

The Quebec hypothèque, essentially equivalent to an American non-possessory lien or English legal charge, is an elastic, hypothecatory security interest that has all the rights of recourse (jus exigendi) of an American lien-theory mortgage or English mortgage by way of legal charge, may also be taken over movable and/or immovable property alike, and must be perfected (i.e. registered). The types as set forth in the Civil Code are:

- hypothèques conventionnelles (art. 2681) - mortgage lien or legal charge (acting as a mortgage)
  - hypothèque immobilière - American real estate mortgage (REM) or English mortgage of land
  - hypothèque mobilière (art. 2702) - Australian personal property security (PPS)
  - hypothèque mobilière sur une créance (art. 2710) - credit mortgage
  - hypothèque ouverte (art. 2715) - American floating lien or English floating charge (in Europe, hypothèque ouverte refers to an open-end mortgage)
- hypothèques légales (art. 2724) - involuntary lien or equitable charge
  - equivalent to the American tax lien, mechanic's or construction lien, home owner's association lien, and judgment lien.

The Qc. Civ. Code also provides for another real security called a priorité, formerly known as a privilège (as it is still known in France, Louisiana, etc.), defined as follows:

A preferential right allowing a creditor to rank prior to all other concurrent creditors, even prior secured creditors [...] (art. 2650)

More specifically, a Quebec priorité is a non-possessory, indivisible, unregistrable (i.e. un-perfectable) real security arising by operation of law alone merely providing a priority right over the security subject. When attaching to movable property, this security interest most closely matches the hypothec as defined at the head of this article. The primary priorités correspond to the American vendor's lien, lien for court costs, municipal lien, and possessory lien (over movables).

==== California ====
Under California Civil Code Section §2920 (a), a mortgage is a contract by which specific property, including an estate for years in real property, is hypothecated for the performance of an act, without the necessity of a change of possession.

== See also ==
- Eurohypothec
- Hypothecated tax
- Securities lending
- Security interest – hypothecation
