= Perpetual subordinated debt =

Perpetual subordinated debt is subordinated debt in the form of a bond with no maturity date for the return of principal. Such a perpetual bond means it never needs to be redeemed by the issuer, and thus pay coupon interest continually until bought back (hence, "perpetual"). Like other subordinated debt, it has claims after senior debt (hence "subordinated") in the event of default.

Perpetual subordinated debt is not "straight debt", rather it is close to, or in some cases identical to, preferred shares, paying a fixed-rate coupon similar to preferred shares' fixed-rate dividend. Perpetual debt comes in two types: cumulative and noncumulative. Interest on cumulative perpetual debt accrues if payments are missed. For noncumulative perpetual debt, if payments are missed, they do not accrue and the cash flow is lost.

Noncumulative perpetual debt is almost identical to typical preferred shares (most of which are noncumulative), the only difference being that preferred shares often have the option of conversion to common shares, while perpetual debt generally does not. Because noncumulative perpetual debt can be counted as Tier 2 capital (supplementary capital), it is generally issued by banks as a way to maintain capital requirements (i.e. capital adequacy ratio or CAR). The debt is generally callable by the issuer at some point.

The first yuan-denominated perpetual subordinated bond was issued by Ananda Development PCL in 2013 in the dim sum bond market.
