= Repealing and Amending Act, 2001 =

Parliament of India
- Long title: An Act to repeal certain enactments and to anend certain other enactments.
- Citation: Act No. 30 of 2001
- Territorial extent: India
- Enacted: 3 September 2001
- Assented to by: President K. R. Narayanan
- Assented to: 3 September 2001
- Commenced: 3 September 2001
- Repealed: 13 May 2015

Repealed by
- Repealing and Amending Act, 2015
- Status: Repealed

The Repealing and Amending Act, 2001 (30 of 2001) was an act of the Parliament of India that completely or partially repealed 357 obsolete laws, and also amended the provisions of Indian Succession Act, 1925 and Code of Criminal Procedure, 1973.

== Repealed Acts ==
Year	Act No.	Short title	Extent of repeal
1985	1	The Foreign Contribution (Regulation) Amendment Act, 1985	The whole
1985	3	The General lnsurailce Business (Nationalisation) Amendment Act, 1985	Sections 2, 3 and 4
1985	9	The Representation of the People (Amendment) Act, 1985	The whole
1985	11	The Sugar Undertakings (Taking Over of Management) Amendment Act, 1985	The whole
1985	12	The Gangtok Municipal Corporation (Amendment) Act, 1985	The whole
1985	20	The Requisitioning and Acquisition of Immovable Property (Amendment) Act, 1985	The whole
1985	24	The Government of Union Territories (Amendment) Act, 1985	The whole
1985	25	The Compulsory Deposit Scheme (Income-tax Payers) Amendment Act, 1985	The whole
1985	26	The Union Duties of Excise (Distribution) Amendment Act, 1985	The whole
1985	27	The Additional Duties of Excise (Goods of Special Importance) Amendment Act, 1985	The whole
1985	28	The Estate Duty (Distribution) Amendment Act, 1985	The whole
1985	30	The Payment of Bonus (Amendment) Act, 1985	The whole
1985	31	The Terrorist and Disruptive Activities (Prevention) Act, 1985	The whole
1985	33	The Coinage (Amendment) Act, 1985	The whole
1985	34	The Andhra Pradesh Legislative Council (Abolition) Act, 1985	Sections 4, 5 and 6
1985	35	The Companies (Amendment) Act, 1985	The whole
1985	36	The High Court and Supreme Court Judges (Conditions of Service) Amendment Act, 1985	The whole
1985	38	The Monopolies and Restrictive Trade Practices (Amendment) Act, 1985	The whole
1985	39	The Arms (Amendment) Act, 1985	The whole
1985	40	The Securities Contracts (Regulation) Amendment Act, 1985	The whole
1985	43	The State Financial Corporations (Amendment) Act, 1985	The whole
1985	44	The Criminal Law Amendment (Amending) Act, 1985	The whole
1985	45	The Terrorist Affected Areas (Special Courts) Amendment Act, 1985	Sections 2 and 3
1985	46	The Terrorist and Disruptive Activities (Prevention) Amendment Act, 1985	The whole
1985	47	The Indian Railways (Amendment) Act, 1985	The whole
1985	48	The Coffee (Amendment) Act, 1985	The whole
1985	49	The Essential Services Maintenance (Amendment) Act, 1985	The whole
1985	51	The Auroville (Emergency Provisions) Amendment Act, 1985	The whole
1985	52	The Estate Duty (Amendment) Act, 1985	The whole
1985	55	The Coal Mines (Conservation and Development) Amendment Act, 1985	The whole
1985	56	The Governnient Savings Laws (Amendment) Act, 1985	The whole
1985	57	The Tobacco Board (Amendment) Act, 1985	The whole
1985	60	The Railway Protection Force (Amendment) Act, 1985	Sections 2 to 18 and the Schedule
1985	62	The Employment of Children (Amendmait) Act, 1985	The whole
1985	63	The Unit Trust of India (Amendment) Act, 1985	The whole
1985	65	The Citizenship (Amendment) Act, 1985	The whole
1985	66	The Lighthouse (Amendment) Act, 1985	The whole
1985	67	The Payment of Bonus (Second Amendment) Act, 1985	The whole
1985	69	The Aircraft (Amendment) Act, 1985	The whole
1985	70	The University Grants Conimission (Amendment) Act, 1985	The whole
1985	72	The lnternational Airports Authority (Amendment) Act, 1985	Sections 2 and 3
1985	73	The Bonded Labour System (Abolition) Amendment Act, 1985	The whole
1985	74	The Salary, Allowances and Pension of Members of Parliament (Amendment) Act, 1985	The whole
1985	75	The Salaries and Allowances of Officers of Parliament (Amendment) Act, 1985	The whole
1985	76	The Salaries and Allowances of Ministers (Amendment) Act, 1985	The whole
1985	77	The President's Pension (Amendment) Act, 1985	The whole
1985	78	The Salary and Allowances of Leaders of Opposition in Parliament (Amendment) Act, 1985	The whole
1985	79	The Central Excises and Salt (Amendment) Act, 1985	Sections 2 to 7
1985	80	The Custonis (Amendment) Act, 1985	Sections 2 to 13
1985	81	The Banking Laws (Amendment) Act, 1985	Sections 2 to 9 and 11 to 18
1986	4	The Delegated Legislation Provisionis (Amendment) Act, 1985	The whole
1986	9	The Motor Vehicles (Amendment) Act, 1986	The whole
1986	14	The Contract Labour (Regulation and Abolition) Amendment Act, 1986	The whole
1986	19	The Administrative Tribunals (Amendment) Act, 1986	Settions 2 to 23
1986	20	The Inter-State Water Disputes (Amendment) Act, 1986	The whole
1986	22	The Supreme Court (Number of Judges) Amendment Act, 1986	The whole
1986	24	The Tea (Amendment) Act, 1986	The whole
1986	26	The Income-tax (Amendment) Act, 1986	The whole
1986	28	The Wild Life (Protection) Amendment Act, 1986	The whole
1986	31	The Indian Electricity (Amendment) Act, 1986	The whole
1986	33	The Merchant Shlpping (Amendment) Act, 1986	Sections 2 to 4
1986	34	The State of Mizoram Act, 1986	Sections 4, 5, 7, 13, 14, 39 to 42, the First Schedule, the Second Schedule, the Third Schedule and the Fourth Schedule
1986	35	The Industrial Development Bank of India (Amendment) Act, 1986	The whole
1986	36	The Commissions of Inquiry (Amendment) Act, 1986	The whole
1986	37	The Mines and Minerels (Regulation and Development) Amendment Act, 1986	The whole
1986	38	The High Court and Supreme Court Judges (Conditions of Service) Amendment Act, 1986	The whole
1986	40	The Tamil Nadu Legislative Council (Abolition) Act, 1986	Sections 4 to 6
1986	41	The Apprentices (Amendment) Act, 1986	The whole
1986	42	The Essential Commodities (Amendment) Act, 1986	The whole
1986	43	The Dowry Prohibition (Amendment) Act, 1986	The whole
1986	44	The Suppression of Immoral Traffic in Women and Girls (Amendment) Act, 1986	The whole
1986	48	The Sales Promotion Employees (Conditions of Service) Amendment Act, 1986	The whole
1986	49	The Estate Duty (Amendment) Act, 1986	The whole
1986	50	The Industrial Finance Corporation (Amendment) Act, 1986	The whole
1986	51	The Citizenship (Amendment) Act, 1986	The whole
1986	57	The Coal Mines Nationalisation Laws (Amendment) Act, 1986	Sections 2 to 18
1986	59	Tlre Atomic Energy (Amendment) Act, 1986	The whole
1986	61	The Child Labour (Prohibition and Regulation) Act, 1986	Sections 23 to 26
1986	67	The Indian Post Office (Second Amendment) Act, 1986	The whole
1986	69	The State of Arunachal Pradesh Act, 1986	Sections 4, 5, 7, 16, 17, 42 to 45, the First Schedule, the Second Schedule, the Third Schedule and the Fourth Schedule
1986	70	The Prevention of Food Adulteration (Amendment) Act, 1986	The whole
1986	71	The Drugs and Cosmetics (Amendment) Act, 1986	The whole
1986	72	The Standards of Weights and Measures (Enforcement) Amendment Act, 1986	The whole
1986	73	The Essential Commodities (Second Amendment) Act, 1986	The whole
1986	74	The Monopolies and Restrictive Trade Practices (Amendment) Act, 1986	The whole
1986	75	The Standards of Weights and Measures (Amendment) Act, 1986	The whole
1986	76	The Agricultural Produce (Grading and Marking) Amendment Act, 1986	The whole
1987	4	The Cotton, Copra and Vegetable Oils Cess (Abolition) Act, 1987	Sections 2 to 10
1987	8	The Delhi Municipal Corporation (Amendment) Act, 1987	The whole
1987	12	The Khadi and Village Industries Commission (Amendment) Act, 1987	The whole
1987	13	The Merchant Shipping (Amendment) Act, 1987	Sections 2 to 9
1987	15	The Labour Welfare Fund Laws (Amendment) Act, 1987	The whole
1987	16	The Goa, Daman and Diu Mining Concessions (Abolition and Declaration as Mining Leases) Act, 1987	Section 14
1987	17	The Governors (Emoluments, Allowances and Privileges) Amendment Act, 1987	The whole
1987	18	The Goa, Daman and Diu Reorganisation Act, 1987	Sections 5, 6, 14, 19, 63 to 65, the First Schedule and the Second Schedule
1987	19	The State of Arunachal Pradesh (Amendment) Act, 1987	The whole
1987	20	The Factories (Amendment) Act, 1987	The whole
1987	21	The Coconut Development Board (Amendment) Act, 1987	The whole
1987	22	The Payment of Gratuity (Amendment) Act, 1987	Sections 2 to 4 and 6 to 9
1987	23	The Conservation of Foreign Exchange and Prevention of Smuggling Activities (Amendment) Act, 1987	The whole
1987	24	The Punjab State Legislature (Delegation of Powers) Act, 1987	The whole
1987	25	The Essential Commodities (Special Provisions) Continuance Act, 1987	The whole
1987	26	The Cine-Workers Welfare Fund (Amendment) Act, 1987	The whole
1987	28	The Terrorist and Disruptive Activities (Prevention) Act, 1987	The whole
1987	29	The Atomic Energy (Amendment) Act, 1987	The whole
1987	30	The All-India Institute of Medical Sciences and the Post-Graduate Institute of Medical Education and Research, Chandigarh (Amendment) Act, 1987	The whole
1987	31	The Representation of the People (Amendment) Act, 1987	The whole
1987	34	The Navy (Amendment) Act, 1987	The whole
1987	35	The Expenditure-tax Act, 1987	Section 33
1987	38	The Representation of the People (Second Amendment) Act, 1987	The whole
1987	40	The Representation of the People (Third Amendment) Act, 1987	The whole
1987	41	The Shipping Development Fund Committee (Abolition) Amendment Act, 1987	The whole
1987	42	The Metro Railways (Construction of Works) Amendment Act, 1987	The whole
1987	44	The Auroville (Emergency Provisions) Amendment Act, 1987	The whole
1987	47	The Air (Prevention and Control of Pollution) Amendment Act, 1987	Clauses (i) and (iii) of section 2, clause (ii) of section 4, sections 5 to 14 and sections 16 to 25.
1987	48	The High Court Judges (Conditions of Service) Amendment Act, 1987	The whole
1987	49	The Equal Remuneration (Amendment) Act, 1987	The whole
1987	50	The Comptroller and Auditor-General's (Duties, Powers and Conditions of Service) Amendment Act, 1987	The whole
1987	51	The Administrative Tribunals (Amendment) Act, 1987	The whole
1987	53	The National Housing Bank Act, 1987	Section 56 and the Second Schedule
1987	54	The Railway Claims Tribunal Act, 1987	Chapter VII
1988	1	The Regional Rural Banks (Amendment) Act, 1987	The whole
1988	3	The Commission of Sati (Prevention) Act, 1987	Section 19
1988	5	The Parsi Marriage and Divorce (Amendment) Act, 1988	The whole
1988	10	The Delhi Administration (Amendment) Act, 1988	The whole
1988	11	The Delhi Municipal Corporation (Amendment) Act, 1988	The whole
1988	12	The Major Port Trusts (Amendment) Act, 1988	The whole
1988	18	The Authorised Translations (Central Laws) Amendment Act, 1988	The whole
1988	19	The Repealing and Amending Act, 1988	The whole
1988	20	The High Court and Supreme Court Judges (Conditions of Service) Amendment Act, 1988	The whole
1988	21	The Tamil Nadu State Legislature (Delegation of Powers) Act, 1988	The whole
1988	22	The Tamil Nadu Agricultural Service Co-operative Societies (Appointment of Special Officers) Amendment Act, 1988	Section 2
1988	23	The Tamil Nadu Co-operative Societies (Appointment of Special Officers) Amendment Act, 1988	The whole
1988	24	The Illegal Migrants (Determination by Tribunals) Amendment Act, 1988	The whole
1988	27	The Customs (Amendment) Act, 1988	The whole
1988	29	The Customs and Central Excises Laws (Amendment) Act, 1988	Sections 2, 3, 6 to 10 and 13 to 15
1988	30	The Rajghat Samadhi (Amendment) Act, 1988	The whole
1988	31	Tle Companies (Amendment) Act, 1988	Sections 3 to 52 and 54 to 67
1988	32	Thc Code of Criminal Proccdure (Amendment) Act, 1988	The whole
1988	33	The Employees' Provident Funds and Miscellaneous Povisions (Amendment) Act, 1988	Sections 2 to 21 and 23 to 27
1988	35	The Cine-Workers and Cinema Theatre Workers (Regulation of Employment) Amendment Act, 1988	The whole
1988	36	The Food Corporations (Amendment) Act, 1988	The whole
1988	38	The Alcock Ashdown Company Limited (Acquisition of Undertakings) Amendment Act, 1988	The whole
1988	42	The Arms (Amendment) Act, 1988	The whole
1988	43	The National Security (Amendment) Act, 1988	The whole
1988	46	The Prevention of Illicit Traffic in Narcotic Drugs and Psychotropic Substances Act, 1988	Section 15
1988	49	The Prevention of Corruption Act, 1988	Section 31
1988	50	The Aircraft (Amendment) Act, 1988	The whole
1988	52	The State of Arunachal Pradesh (Amendment) Act, 1988	The whole
1988	53	The Water (Preveation and Control of Pollution) Amendment Act, 1988	The whole
1988	55	The Merchant Shipping (Amendment) Act, 1988	The whole
1988	56	The Dock Workers (Regulation of Employment) Amendment Act, 1988	The whole
1988	57	The Delhi Rent Control (Amendment) Act, 1988	The whole
1988	60	The Salary, Allowances and Pension of Members of Parliament (Amendment) Act, 1988	The whole
1988	61	The Maternity Benefit (Amendment) Act, 1988	The whole
1988	62	The Monopolies and Restrictive Trade Practices (Amendment) Act, 1988	The whole
1988	63	The Commissions of lnquiry (Amendment) Act, 1988	The whole
1988	66	The Banking, Public Financial Institutions and Negotiable Instruments Laws (Amendment) Act, 1988	The whole
1988	69	The Forest (Conservation) Amendment Act, 1988	The whole
1989	1	The Representation of the People (Amendment) Act, 1988	The whole
1989	2	The Narcotic Drugs and Psychotropic Substances (Amendment) Act, 1988	The whole
1989	10	The Delhi Municipal Laws (Amendment) Act, 1989	The whole
1989	11	The Income-tax (Amendment) Act, 1989	The whole
1989	15	The Chandigarh Disturbed Areas (Amendment) Act, 1989	The whole
1989	16	The Terrorist and Disruptive Activities (Prevention) Amendment Act, 1989	The whole
1989	17	The Union Duties of Excise (Distribution) Amendmcrit Act, 1989	The whole
1989	18	The Additional Duties of Excise (Goods of Special Importance) Amendment Act, 1989	The whole
1989	20	The Central Industrial Security Force (Amendment) Act, 1989	The whole
1989	21	The Representation of the People (Amendment) Act, 1989	Sections 2 to 5
1989	25	The Delhi Motor Vellicles Taxation (Amendment) Act, 1989	The whole
1989	29	The Employees' State lnsurance (Amendment) Act, 1989	Sections 2 to 8, 10 to 44, 46 and 47.
1989	30	The Salary, Allowances and Pension of Members of Parliament (Amendment) Act, 1989	The whole
1989	31	The Working Journalists and other Newspaper Employees (Conditions of Service) and Miscellaneous Provisions (Amendment) Act, 1989	The whole
1989	32	The High Court and Supreme Court Judges (Conditions of Service) Amendment Act, 1989	The whole
1989	35	The Nagaland University Act, 1989	Section 48
1989	37	The Warehousing Corporations (Amendment) Act, 1989	The whole
1989	38	The General Insurance Business (Nationalisation) Amendment Act, 1989	The whole
1989	39	The Small Industries Development Bank of India Act, 1989	Section 53 and the Second Schedule
1989	40	The Customs (Amendment) Act, 1989	The whole
1990	2	The Representation of the People (Amendment) Act, 1989	The whole
1990	9	The Criminal Law Amendment (Amending) Act, 1990	The whole
1990	10	The Code of Crimiral Procedure (Amendment) Act, 1990	The whole
1990	13	The Union Duties of Excise (Distribution) Amendment Act, 1990	The whole
1990	14	The Additional Duties of Excise (Goods of Special Importance) Amendment Act, 1990	The whole
1990	16	The President's Emoluments and Pension (Amendment) Act, 1990	The whole
1990	17	The Salaries and Allowances of Officers of Parliament (Amendment) Act, 1990	The whole
1990	18	The Gold (Control) Repeal Act, 1990	The whole
1990	19	The Commissions of Inquiry (Amendment) Act, 1990	The whole
1990	26	The Prevention of Illicit Traffic in Narcotic Drugs and Psychotropic Substances (Amendment) Act, 1990	The whole
1990	27	The Conservation of Foreign Exchange and Prevention of Smuggling Activities (Amendment) Act, 1990	The whole
1991	1	The Cantonments (Amendment) Act, 1991	The whole
1991	7	The Salary and Allowances of Leaders of Opposition in Parliament (Amendment) Act, 1991	The whole
1991	8	The Reserve Bank of lndia (Amendment) Act, 1991	The whole
1991	9	The Reserve Bank of India (Second Amendment) Act, 1991	The whole
1991	10	The Jammu and Kashmir Criminal Law Amendment (Amending) Act, 1991	The whole
1991	31	The Representation of the People (Amendment) Act, 1991	The whole
1991	32	The Delhi Municipal Laws (Amendment) Act, 1991	The whole
1991	33	The Jammu and Kashmir Criminal Law Amendment (Second Amending) Act, 1991	The whole
1991	34	The Consumer Protection (Amendment) Act, 1991	Sections 2, 3 and 4
1991	35	The Terrorist and Disruptive Activities (Prevention) Amendment Act, 1991	The whole
1991	38	The Cancellation of General Elections in Punjab Act, 1991	The whole
1991	40	The Central Excises and Customs Laws (Amendment) Act, 1991	The whole
1991	42	The Places of Worship (Special Provisions) Act, 1991	Section 8
1991	43	The Code of Criminal Procedure (Amendment) Act, 1991	The whole
1991	44	The Wild Life (Protection) Amendment Act, 1991	Sections 2 to 21, 23 to 29, clauses (i) and (iii) of section 30 and sections 3 1 to 52.
1991	47	The Voluntary Deposits (Immunities and Exemptions) Act, 1991	Section 5
1991	48	The Special Protection Group (Amendment) Act, 1991	The whole
1991	50	The Electricity Laws (Amendment) Act, 1991	The whole
1991	51	The Indian Succession (Amendment) Act, 1991	The whole
1991	53	The Water (Prevention and Control of Pollution) Cess (Amendment) Act, 1991	The whole
1991	54	The Banking Regulation (Amendment) Act, 1991	The whole
1991	55	The Customs (Amendment) Act, 1991	The whole
1991	56	The Tea Companies (Acquisition and Transfer of Sick Tea Units) Amendment Act, 1991	The whole
1991	57	The Sick Industrial Companies (Special Provisions) Amendment Act, 1991	The whole
1991	58	The Monopolies and Restrictive Trade Practices (Amendment) Act, 1991	The whole
1991	59	The Family Courts (Amendment) Act, 1991	The whole
1991	60	The Delhi High Court (Amendment) Act, 1991	Section 3
1992	1	The Government of National Capital Territory of Delhi Act, 1991	Section 55
1992	2	The Representation of the People (Amendment) Act, 1992	The whole
1992	11	The Public Liability Insurance (Amendment) Act, 1992	The whole
1992	12	The Destructive Insects and Pests (Amendment and Validation) Act, 1992	Section 2
1992	13	The Copyright (Amendment) Act, 1992	Section 2
1992	14	The Indian Red Cross Society (Amendment) Act, 1992	The whole
1992	15	The Securities and Exchange Board of India Act, 1992	Section 33 and the Schedule
1992	20	The Parliament (Prevention of Disqualification) Amendment Act, 1992	The whole
1992	21	The Jammu and Kashrnir State Legislature (Delegation of Powers) Act, 1992	The whole
1992	23	The Indian Ports (Amendment) Act, 1992	The whole
1992	24	The Bhopal Gas Leak Disaster (Processing of Claims) Amendment Act, 1992	The whole
1992	26	The Capital Issues (Control) Repeal Act, 1992	The whole
1992	28	The Foreign Exchange Conservation (Travel) Tax Abolition Act, 1992	The whole
1992	36	The Banking Companies (Acquisition and Transfer of Undertakings) Amendment Act, 1992	The whole
1992	37	The Army (Amendment) Act, 1992	The whole
1992	38	The Representation of the People (Amendment) Act, 1992	The whole
1992	39	The Citizenship (Amendment) Act, 1992	The whole
1993	1	The National Highways (Amendment) Act, 1992	The whole
1993	3	The Salary, Allowances and Pension of Members of Parliament (Amendment) Act, 1992	The whole
1993	4	The Oilfields (Regulation and Development) Amendment Act, 1993	The whole
1993	5	The Himachal Pradesh State Legislature (Delegation of Powers) Act, 1993	The whole
1993	8	The Uttar Pradesh State Legislature (Delegation of Powers) Act, 1993	The whole
1993	9	The Madhya Pradesh State Legislature (Delegation of Powers) Act, 1993	The whole
1993	10	The Rajasthan State Legislature (Delegation of Powers) Act, 1993	The whole
1993	26	The Wild Life (Protection) Amendment Act, 1993	The whole
1993	28	The Multimodal Transportation of Goods Act, 1993	Section 31 and the Schedule
1993	29	The Foreign Exchange Regulation (Amendment) Act, 1993	The whole
1993	30	The Dentists (Amendment) Act, 1993	The whole
1993	31	The Indian Medical Council (Amendment) Act, 1993	The whole
1993	34	The Essential Commodities (Special Provisions) Amendment Act, 1993	The whole
1993	35	The Passports (Amendment) Act, 1993	The whole
1993	37	The Cine-Workers Welfare Cess (Amendment) Act, 1993	The whole
1993	40	The Code of Criminal Procedure (Amendment) Act, 1993	The whole
1993	42	The Criminal Law (Amendment) Act, 1993	The whole
1993	43	The Terrorist and Disruptive Activities (Preventioil) Amendment Act, 1993	The whole
1993	47	The Coal Mines (Nationalisation) Amendment Act, 1993	The whole
1993	48	The Salary, Allowances and Pension of Members of Parliament (Amendment) Act, 1993	The whole
1993	49	The Betwa River Board (Amendment) Act, 1993	Sections 2 and 3
1993	50	The Consumer Protection (Amendment) Act, 1993	The whole
1993	52	The Conservation of Foreign Exchange and Prevention of Smuggling Activities (Amendment) Act, 1993	The whole
1993	53	The Prevention of Illicit Traffic in Narcotic Drugs and Psychotropic Substances (Amendment) Act, 1993	The whole
1993	54	The Parliament (Prevention of Disqualification) Amendment Act, 1993	The whole
1993	66	The Extradition (Amendment) Act, 1993	The whole
1993	67	The Delhi Municipal Corporation (Amendment) Act, 1993	The whole
1993	68	The Merchant Shipping (Amendment) Act, 1993	The whole
1993	70	The Advocates (Amendment) Act, 1993	The whole
1993	71	The President's Emoluments and Pension (Amendment) Act, 1993	The whole
1993	72	The Supreme Court Judges (Conditions of Service) Amendment Act, 1993	The whole
1994	1	The Governors (Emoluments, Allowances and Privileges) Amendment Act, 1993	The whole
1994	2	The High Court and Supreme Court Judges (Condition of Service) Amendment Act, 1993	The whole
1994	3	The State Bank of India (Amendment) Act, 1993	The whole
1994	4	The Chief Election Commissioner and other Election Commissioners (Conditions of Service) Amendment Act, 1993	The whole
1994	7	The Public Premises (Eviction of Unauthorised Occupants) Amendment Act, 1993	The whole
1994	8	The Inland Waterways Authority of India (Amendment) Act, 1993	The whole
1994	9	The Jute Manufacturers Development Council (Amendment) Act, 1993	The whole
1994	11	The Census (Amendment) Act, 1993	The whole
1994	12	The Sick Industrial Companies (Special Provisions) Amendment Act, 1993	The whole
1994	20	The Banking Regulation (Amendment) Act, 1994	The whole
1994	23	The Coffee (Amendment) Act, 1994	The whole
1994	24	The Special Court (Trial of Offences Relating to Transactions in Securities) Amendment Act, 1994	The whole
1994	25	The Mines and Minerals (Regulation and Development) Amendment Act, 1994	The whole
1994	28	The Railways (Amendment) Act, 1994	The whole
1994	33	The Rubber (Amendment) Act, 1994	The whole
1994	34	The Payment of Gratuity (Amendment) Act, 1994	The whole
1994	35	The Institutes of Technology (Amendment) Act, 1994	The whole
1994	36	The Press Council (Amendment) Act, 1994	The whole
1994	37	The Banking Companies (Acquisition and Transfer of Undertakings) Amendment Act, 1994	The whole
1994	38	The Copyright (Amendment) Act, 1994	The whole
1994	39	The Anti-hijacking (Amendment) Act, 1994	The whole
1994	40	The Suppression of Unlawful Acts Against Safety of Civil Aviation (Amendment) Act, 1994	The whole
1994	41	The Coir Industry (Amendment) Act, 1994	The whole
1994	51	The Comptroller and Auditor-General's (Duties, Powers and Conditions of Service) Amendment Act, 1994	The whole
1994	54	The Motor Vehicles (Amendment) Act, 1994	The whole
1994	55	The Airports Authority of lndia Act, 1994	Section 45
1994	59	The Legal Services Authorities (Amendment) Act, 1994	The whole
1995	1	The Contingency Fund of India (Amendment) Act, 1994	The whole
1995	4	The Special Protection Group (Amendment) Act, 1995	The whole
1995	5	The Industrial Development Bank of India (Amendment) Act, 1995	The whole
1995	6	The Customs Tariff (Amendment) Act, 1995	The whole
1995	8	The Banking Companies (Acquisition and Transfer of Undertakings) Amendment Act, 1995	The whole
1995	9	The Securities Laws (Amendment) Act, 1995	The whole
1995	18	The Salary, Allowances and Pension of Members of Parliament (Amendment) Act, 1995	The whole
1995	19	The Cotton Transport Repeal Act, 1995	The whole
1995	24	The Indian Penal Code (Amendment) Act, 1995	The whole
1995	25	The Assam University (Amendment) Act, 1995	The whole
1995	26	The National Highways (Amendment) Act, 1995	The whole
1995	28	The Recovery of Debts Due to Banks and Financial Institutions (Amendment) Act, 1995	The whole
1995	29	The Maternity Benefit (Amendment) Act, 1995	The whole
1995	30	The Workmen's Compensation (Amendment) Act, 1995	The whole
1995	31	The Union Duties of Excise Distribution Amendment Act, 1995	The whole
1995	32	The Additional Duties of Excise (Goods of Special Importance) Amendment Act, 1995	The whole
1995	34	The Payment of Bonus (Amendment) Act, 1995	The whole
1995	38	The Indian Statistical Institute (Amendment) Act, 1995	The whole
1995	40	The Sick Textile Undertakings (Nationalisation) Amendment Act, 1995	The whole
1995	41	The National Commission for Minioritics (Amendment) Act, 1995	The whole
1995	45	The Research and Development Cess (Amendment) Act, 1995	The whole
1996	1	The Persons with Disabilities (Equal Opportunities, Protection of Rights and Full Participation) Act, 1995	Section 74
1996	2	The Uttar Pradesh State Legislature (Delegation of Powers) Act, 1995	The whole
1996	15	The Conservation of Foreign Exchange and Prevention of Smuggling Activities (Amendment) Act, 1996	The whole
1996	16	The Prevention of Illicit Traffic in Narcotic Drugs and Psychotropic Substances (Amendment) Act, 1996	The whole
1996	20	The Supreme Court and High Court Judges (Conditions of Service) Amendment Act, 1996	The whole
1996	21	The Representation of the People (Amendment) Act, 1996	The whole
1996	22	The Depositories Act, 1996	Section 30 and the Schedule
1996	23	The Coal Mines Provident Fund and Miscellaneous Provisions (Amendment) Act, 1996	The whole
1996	24	The Industrial Disputes (Amendment) Act, 1996	The whole
1996	25	The Employees, Provident Funds and Miscellaneous Provisions (Amendment) Act, 1996	The whole
1996	29	The Representation of the People (Second Amendment) Act, 1996	The whole
1996	34	The Working Journalists and other Newspaper Employees (Conditions of Service) and Miscellaneous Provisions (Amendment) Act, 1996	The whole
1996	35	The Income-tax (Amendment) Act, 1996	The whole
1996	36	The Delhi Development (Amendment) Act, 1996	The whole
1997	1	The Indian Contract (Amendment) Act, 1996	The whole
1997	4	The Apprentices (Amendment) Act, 1996	The whole
1997	5	The Companies (Amendment) Act, 1996	The whole
1997	6	The Special Court (Trial of Offences Relating to Transactions in Securities) Amendment Act, 1997	The whole
1997	7	The Industrial Reconstruction Bank (Transfer of Undertakings and Repeal) Act, 1997	Section 14
1997	8	The Depositories Related Laws (Amendment) Act, 1997	The whole
1997	14	The Income-tax (Amendment) Act, 1997	The whole
1997	15	The Port Laws (Amendment) Act, 1997	The whole
1997	16	The NationaI Highways Law (Amendment) Act, 1997	The whole
1997	18	The National Commission for Safai Karamcharis (Amendment) Act, 1997	The whole
1997	23	The Reserve Bank of India (Amendment) Act, 1997	The whole
1997	28	The Rice-Milling Industry (Regulation) Repeal Act, 1997	The whole
1997	29	The Seamen's Provident Fund (Amendment) Act, 1997	The whole
1997	32	The Indira Gandhi National Open University (Amendment) Act, 1997	The whole
1997	35	The Presidential and Vice-Presidential Elections (Amendment) Act, 1997	The whole
1998	4	The Contingency Fund of India (Amendment) Act, 1998	The whole
1998	7	The lncome-tax (Amendment) Act, 1998	The whole
1998	9	The Merchant Shipping (Amendment) Act, 1998	The whole
1998	10	The Employees' Provident Funds and Miscellaneous . Provisions (Amendment) Act, 1998	The whole
1998	11	The Payment of Gratuity (Amendment) Act, 1998	The whole
1998	12	The Representation of the People (Amendment) Act, 1998	The whole
1998	18	The High Court and Supreme Court Judges (Conditions of Service) Amendment Act, 1998	The whole
1998	22	The Electricity Laws (Amendment) Act, 1998	The whole
1998	23	The Interest on Delayed Payments to Small Scale and Ancillary Industrial Undertakings (Amendment) Act, 1998	The whole
1998	24	The Beedi Workers Welfare Cess (Amendment) Act, 1998	The whole
1998	25	The President's Emoluments and Pension (Amendment) Act, 1998	The whole
1998	26	The Salaries and Allowances of Officers of Parliament (Amendment) Act, 1998	The whole
1998	27	The Governors (Emoluments, Allowances and Privileges) Amendment Act, 1998	The whole
1998	28	The Salary, Allowances and Pension of Members of Parliament (Amendment) Act, 1998	The whole
1998	29	The Oilfields (Regulation and Development) Amendment Act, 1998	The whole

== Amendments ==
Year	Act No.	Short title		Amendments			
1925	39	The Indian Succession Act, 1925		In Schedule II, in Part II, in entry (6), for the words "grandparents' children", the words "grandparent's parents' children" shall be substituted.			
1974	2	The Code of Criminal Procedure, 1973		In the First Schedule, for the entries relating to section 377, the following entries shall be substituted, namely:—			
		1	2	3	4	5	6
		"377	Unnatural offences	Imprisonment for life, or imprisonment for ten years and fine.	cognizable	Nonbailable	Magistrate of the first class"
