= Kapil Dev Sharma =

Indian scientist

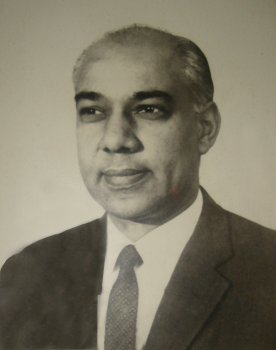
- Kapil Dev Sharma
- Born: 27 July 1920; Gujranwala, Gujranwala District, Pakistan
- Died: 13 October 2006 (aged 86); New Delhi, India
- Occupation: Glass Scientist
- Spouse: Nirmal Sharma
- Children: 2

Kapil Dev Sharma (1920-2006) born in Gujaranwala (now in Pakistan) was an Indian scientist and technologist who specialized as a glass technologist.

== Education ==
Sharma successfully completed his BSc degree at Panjab University, a BSc (Glass Tech.) at Banaras Hindu University; and an MSc (Technology) from Sheffield.

== Career ==
He worked in the glass industry for about a year and in 1945 proceeded to UK for higher studies as a Government of India scholar. He carried out research work at Sheffield University under Prof. W.E.S. Turner, F.R.S., and Prof H. Moore. He worked in the glass plants of Rockware Glass Ltd., Greenford, UK and Karhula lasitehdas, Finland. Sharma joined the institute as a scientific officer in September, 1948 and was associated with the planning and development of the institute from almost the beginning. During 1953–54, he worked at the Glass Section of the National Bureau of Standards, US, as a guest worker. He was assistant director in 1954, deputy director in 1960 and director from 1967 to 1980 of the Central Glass and Ceramic Research Institute.

He has also served with the United Nations Development Program as a glass expert for several short term assignments in Cuba and Jamaica among other places.

== Fellow ==
Society of Glass Technology, U.K.; Institute of Ceramics, UK; President, Indian Institute of Ceramics; President, Indian Ceramic Society.

== Member ==
He visited the USSR in 1959 as a member of the Government of India Expert Team for the optical and ophthalmic glass project. He also went to US and UK in 1962 as alternate leader of the NPC Study Team on Glass Industry; Member International Commission on Glass; and Chairman of ISI Sectional Committee for Glassware.

== Awards and honors ==
He was awarded the R G Nail Gold Medal from M S University, Baroda.

The "K.D. Sharma Memorial Lecture" has also been instituted.

A multipurpose hall has also been made at the Central Glass and Ceramic Research Institute complex in Kolkata.

== Notable contribution ==
1. Development and production of optical glass, which is a strategic defence material for the first time in India
2. Development of foam glass
3. radiation shielding windows for nuclear reactors and glass melting furnaces
4. glass raw materials
5. productivity
6. Filed 3 patents.

== Miscellaneous ==
His name also appears in the book, "Who's who in the world".
