= Bankers' Books Evidence Act, 1891 =

Act of Imperial Legislative Council of India

Imperial Legislative Council
- Long title: An Act to amend the Law of Evidence with respect to Bankers’ Books.
- Citation: Act No. 18 of 1891
- Enacted by: Imperial Legislative Council
- Enacted: 13 March 1891
- Commenced: 1 April 1892
- Status: In force

The Bankers' Books Evidence Act, 1891 is an act in India dating from the British colonial rule, that is still in force until 2026 largely unchanged. The Act is going to be replaced with the Bankers' Books Evidence Act, 2026 with effect from 1 October 2026.

== History ==
In the late 19th century, the banking industry in India was a rapidly developing industry. Every year, new banks were being established, some by Indian businessmen, and others by mostly European owners. The main question which arose was whether the rules of evidence in Indian banking would be governed by British legislation, as India was then a British colony. As a result, it was decide to adapt and adopt the Bankers' Books Evidence Act 1879 (42 & 43 Vict. c. 11) of the British Parliament to Indian banking. The Indian Bankers' Books Evidence Act, 1891 was therefore enacted and continues to be in force to the present day.

== Tenets and precepts ==
The main tenets and precepts of the Act are that whenever any bank or banker is compelled to provide evidence to a court or judge, the original documents need not be produced and that a copy of the original documents are sufficient for legal purposes.

Today, the Act is also in force in the former British colonies of Pakistan and Bangladesh, which were formerly ruled as parts of undivided India.

== Review and reform ==
The Act has been further amended by the Information Technology Act, 2000 which expanded the meaning and scope of Bankers Books to include computer documents, files and external storage. Now any banking related evidence can be produced in electronic format with no requirement for paperwork.

== Court cases involving the act ==
There have been many court cases involving the Bankers' Books Evidence Act, 1891:

- M/s ICICI Bank Limited v. Kapil Dev Sharma
- Sonu and Amar v. The State of Haryana
- Om Prakash v. The Central Bureau of Investigation
- M/s Ashoka Chemicals v. Bharatiya Hindu Shudhi Sabha Trust
- Ishwar Das Jain v. Sohan Lal
- Radheshyam G. Garg v. Safiyabai Ibrahim Lightwalla
