= A Splendid Exchange =

2008 nonfiction book by William J. Bernstein

A Splendid Exchange: How Trade Shaped The World
- Cover of the first edition
- Author: William Bernstein
- Language: English
- Subject: History
- Publisher: Atlantic Books
- Publication date: 2008
- Publication place: United States
- Media type: Print (Hardcover and Paperback)
- Pages: 400
- ISBN: 978-1-84354-668-9

A Splendid Exchange: How Trade Shaped The World (London: Atlantic Books, 2008) is a book by American author William Bernstein.

== Summary ==
The book describes the history of world trade in detail. The author begins from Mesopotamian times and then describes the exploits of Vasco da Gama.

== Reception ==
It has been reviewed by The Guardian, The New York Times, and The Economist.

== See also ==
- The Birth of Plenty
