= Security interest =

Legal right between a debtor and creditor over the debtor's property (collateral)

In law and finance, a security interest is a legal right that a secured party has over secured assets. Security interests most often arise where a debtor grants an interest over collateral to a creditor to secure the loan, such that the creditor will have enforceable rights in the event of the debtor's default or non-performance.

In the event that the debtor is unable to perform their contractual obligations, the secured creditor may not only sue the debtor for contractual damages or recovery of debt, but may also enforce their proprietary rights over the assets (e.g. by seizure and sale) and obtain priority over unsecured and subordinate creditors in the event of insolvency.

The most common security interest is the mortgage, which often involves a creditor bank securing an interest in a debtor homeowner's land for the payment of a loan used to finance the purchase of the home. Although most security interests are created by agreement between the parties, it is also possible for a security interest to arise automatically by operation of law.

== History ==
=== English common law ===
Almost every legal jurisdiction today recognises security interests, generally security interests in rem (proprietary or real) and interests in personam (personal), although the laws relating to taking and enforcing security vary greatly by country and legal system.

Security interests in common law jurisdictions originate in the common-law courts and the courts of chancery. Historically, only the Court of Chancery recognised security interests over both land and moveable property, whereas the common law courts recognised two kinds of security interests, only over moveable or personal property: liens and pledges. The creation of equitable security interests often originated in the concepts of unconscionability and fraud.

As such, the modern doctrine of the mortgage originates in the law of equity. Prior to the enactment of the Law of Property Act 1925, mortgages over land could only arise where the borrower or mortgagor transferred their entire estate (or, alternatively, demise a lease) to the creditor or mortgagee, with only a contractual agreement that the mortgagee would return the estate once all payments had been made. The courts of equity, nonetheless, recognised that the mortgagor had not merely a contractual interest in the property but a proprietary one known as the equity of redemption, such that the mortgagor could redeem the property in equity even if he could no longer do so under the terms of contract. The language of "foreclosure" of mortgage originates from the equity, with the mortgagee retaining the eventual ability to "foreclose the prospect of redemption".

By the mid-20th century, mortgages over land began to be recognised as legal, often statutory, interests rather than equitable ones, although a distinct category of equitable mortgages had also emerged in English law. Equity also recognised the security interest of the charge as being able to be created over any form of property, including land.

=== Reception in the United States ===
In the late 1940s, the United States legal community arrived at a consensus that the traditional common law distinctions were obsolete and served no useful purpose. They tended to generate too much unnecessary litigation about whether the creditor had selected the correct type of security interest. There was a growing recognition that the different types of security interests had developed only because of case-specific historical reasons.

The result was Article 9 of the Uniform Commercial Code (UCC), which regulates security interests in personal property (as opposed to real property) and establishes a unified concept of a security interest as a right in a debtor's property that secures payment or performance of an obligation. Article 9 was subsequently enacted, although not entirely without variations, by the 50 states, District of Columbia, and most territories.

If the debtor defaults (and does not file for bankruptcy), the UCC offers the creditor the choice of either suing the debtor in court or conducting a disposition by either public or private sale. UCC dispositions are designed to be held by private parties without any judicial involvement, although the debtor and other secured creditors of the debtor have the right to sue the creditor conducting the disposition if it is not conducted in a "commercially reasonable" fashion to maximize proceeds from the sale of the collateral.

Article 9 is limited in scope to personal property and fixtures (i.e., personal property attached to real property). Security interests in real property continue to be governed by non-uniform laws (in the form of statutory law or case law or both) which vary dramatically from state to state. In a slight majority of states, the deed of trust is the primary instrument for taking a security interest in real property, while the mortgage is used in the remainder. The Uniform Law Commission's attempt during the 1970s to encourage the enactment of uniform land transaction laws was a catastrophic failure.

=== Influence of the UCC internationally ===
The UCC Article 9 inspired the enactment of the Personal Property Security Acts throughout Canada during the 1990s. After, international development experts recognized in the mid-1990s that reform of the law of security interests contributed to the economic prosperity of both Canada and United States in enabling businesses to finance growth through forms of secured lending which simply did not exist elsewhere.

The International Monetary Fund, the World Bank, and other international lenders began to encourage other countries to follow Canada's example as part of the structural adjustment process (a consultation process often required as a condition of their loans). Over the next three decades, the Canadian PPSAs inspired developments in Australia, New Zealand, Vanuatu, Papua New Guinea, the Jersey, the Samoa, and the Jamaica.

In 2002, the Organization of American States promulgated the Model Inter-American Law on Secured Transactions, in response to a rapidly growing body of empirical evidence that the chronic failure of Latin America's legal systems to support modern asset-based financing is a primary reason for the region's economic instability. The OAS Model Law attempted to import many of the best parts of UCC Article 9 into the Latin American civil law sphere, but with extensive revisions for that region's unique problems. The OAS Model Law has been enacted to some extent in several countries, including Mexico (2000, 2003, and 2010), Peru (2006), Guatemala (2007), and Honduras (2009). To date, only Honduras has been able to fully enact and actually implement the OAS Model Law in the sense of unifying security interests and making them easily visible on a public registry.

=== Contemporary reforms ===
The first major attempt to bring the benefits of UCC Article 9 to civil law jurisdictions was launched by the European Bank for Reconstruction and Development in 1992, which resulted in the EBRD Model Law for Secured Transactions in 1994. However, the EBRD Model Law's approach to the entire subject differed radically from UCC Article 9, and it was also quite limited. For example, it did not have provisions for purchase money security interests. Nearly all Central and Eastern European countries undertook reform of their secured transactions laws in the 1990s and 2000s, although most of them either came up with ad hoc indigenous solutions or followed the EBRD Model Law to some extent. Only Albania, Kosovo, and Montenegro attempted to closely follow the UCC Article 9 approach.

Separately, after the issue of secured transactions reform was recommended to the United Nations Commission on International Trade Law in 2000 by the Secretary-General, UNCITRAL eventually prepared a Legislative Guide on Secured Transactions as a recommendation to all countries, which ended up structured as a "political compromise" between "sharply divergent" legal systems. The Legislative Guide did not conform to Article 9's terminology or structure. On December 11, 2008, the Guide was subsequently endorsed by the 67th plenary meeting of the United Nations General Assembly in Resolution 63/121, which took effect January 15, 2009.

== Doctrine ==
Security interests arise from situations involving a secured party (for example, a creditor) and secured property, which is often collateral for a loan made to a debtor. They can be created either by agreement or imposed by courts upon the operation of law. The Oxford English Dictionary defines security in law as "property, etc., deposited or pledged by or on behalf of a person as a guarantee of the payment of a debt, and liable to forfeit in the event of default", noting further that the term security in financial markets is derived from the concept of a security interest as a "means of being or making secure":

Originally: a document held by a creditor as a guarantee of the right to payment, or attesting ownership of property, stock, bonds, etc.; (hence) the financial asset represented by such a document. Also (originally and chiefly U.S.): such a document issued to investors to finance a business venture.

=== Rationale ===
Security interests allow a creditor to have rights against the debtor in the event of default of an obligation or insolvency, beyond the rights they may usually have. In particular, security interests can give the creditor proprietary rights over the debtor's property as well as priority in the event that the creditor becomes insolvent.

Security interests also have a number of microeconomic effects, particularly in commercial secured lending contexts. Depending on the terms of the security agreement, they may allow one creditor to ensure that no other bank would lend to the debtor as a result of the scope of the charge, resulting in a form of anticompetitive practice. Some economists have also questioned the general notion of different creditors having different priorities and repossession, which they believe places too much potentially destructive power in the hands of creditors while also violating the conceptual purpose of insolvency as a pari passu process. Although unsecured creditors will receive less on insolvency, and despite the fact that they should theoretically be able to compensate by charging a higher interest rate, many unsecured creditors (such as tort claimants and employees) are unable to adjust their "interest rates" upwards, thus allowing the company to benefit from a cheaper rate of credit, to the detriment of these non-secured creditors.

For this reason, many jurisdictions restrict the ability of secured creditors to enforce their rights in a bankruptcy. In the US, the Chapter 11 creditor protection, which completely prevents enforcement of security interests, aims at keeping enterprises running at the expense of creditors' rights, and is often heavily criticised for that reason. (Note: The Economist described the American bankruptcy system, tongue-in-cheek, as "...perverse affairs. First, failed managers often hang on to the helm well after their firms have officially gone bust. After companies seek safe harbour under Chapter 11, America's famous insolvency law, banks swoop in to lend them even more money. Next, lawyers help the firm restructure older debts, giving bosses months or years to run their businesses interest-free. Failure, American style, is nice work if you can get it".) In the United Kingdom, an administration order has a similar effect, but is less expansive in scope and restriction in terms of creditors rights. European systems are often touted as being pro-creditor, but many European jurisdictions also impose restrictions upon time limits that must be observed before secured creditors can enforce their rights.

=== Perfection ===
Perfection of security interests means different things to lawyers in different jurisdictions.

- in English law, perfection has no defined statutory or judicial meaning, but academics have pressed the view that it refers to the attachment of the security interest to the underlying asset. Others have argued cogently that attachment is a separate legal concept, and that perfection refers to any steps required to ensure that the security interest is enforceable against third parties.
- in American law, perfection is generally taken to refer to any steps required to ensure that the security interest remains enforceable against other creditors or other parties, including a bankruptcy trustee in the case of the debtor's bankruptcy.

=== Remedies ===
Where a security agreement has created both a proprietary and personal right, the security holder may seek to enforce either or both rights against the secured party, which may entail a number of different remedies, including possession, sale, foreclosure, the appointment of a receiver, and appropriation.

== Types ==
Securities can be categorised in a number of ways: possessory and nonpossessory; consensual and by operation of law; proprietary and personal; and legal and equitable.

=== Mortgage ===
The most common form of security interest is the mortgage, which is defined differently across contexts and jurisdictions. The word "mort-gage" comes from the French term meaning "dead pledge", and is in distinction to the "living pledge" whereby the party who benefits from the security interest was expected to take possession of the mortgaged property, and work it to generate a profit; such security interests fell into disuse centuries ago.

In a lay, non-technical sense, a mortgage arises where the creditor acquires a security interest over the debtor's land, such that payment for the loan is secured by the mortgage, and upon default the creditor (or mortagee) can seize and sell the property of the debtor (or mortgagor). Historically, the mortgage originates in the Court of Chancery, particularly in the equity of redemption, which arose where the debtor conveyed their assets (typically land) to the creditor as security for a loan, with a contractual agreement allowing for a right of redemption. Such a method of creating a mortgage, however, is largely deprecated across common-law jurisdictions, which have developed more sophisticated statutory mortgage regimes.

English law continues to recognise the equity of redemption through the doctrine of equitable mortgage, which may arise in a number of situations, including where parties contract to a mortgage but end up failing to eventually validly execute the mortgage; where an existing mortgagor, having only the equity of redemption, wants to grant a second mortgage; or where the mortgagor only has an equitable interest, for example, as a beneficiary of a trust.

Generally, upon default, remedies available to the mortgagee include foreclosure, sale of the assets, and the appointment of a receiver. In a strict, technical, historical legal sense, foreclosure refers to the extinguishing of the equity of redemption. (Note: Re Farnol, Eades, Irvine & Co [1915] 1 Ch 22. "Foreclosure as a thing which can be done by a person has no meaning. Foreclosure is done by the order of the court, not by any person. In the strict legal sense it is nothing more than the destruction of the equity of redemption which previously existed." per Warrington J at 24.) Depending on the jurisdiction, mortgagees may have different powers and duties in selling assets in relation to being able to sell the assets without the intervention of the court or selling the assets in a specific manner or according to specific rules and standards.

=== Pledge ===
In Roman law, a pledge, or pignus, was a type of contract where the debtor would give physical possession to the creditor as security for a debt. As the creditor has possession but no ownership, he could not use, sell, or alter the property but only had recourse upon default. Pledges in common law jurisdictions operate in much the same way.

=== Lien ===
Historically, in the common law, a lien was a possessory security over moveable property previously delivered to the lienholder, imposed either consensually or by operation of law. This remains the definition in England, although in the United States, a lien can be a nonpossessory security interest. Particularly instances of liens have been recognised in the common law, for example, a common carrier having a lien security interest over cargo for the carriage charges.

The courts of equity also recognised the concept of a lien, although the concept of an equitable lien is largely the same as that of an equitable charge.

=== Charge ===
A charge is a security interest over assets and can take the form of a fixed charge (where the chargor or "borrower" can dispose of the property without the chargee's consent) or a floating charge (where the chargor can dispose of the assets in the ordinary course of business). The modern doctrine of charges originates in the courts of equity, particularly in the mid to late 19th century, and are generally of an equitable nature. Charges were developed as an abstraction to solve commercial problems before the courts relating to issues of priority, title, and other commercial law issues. The courts would recognise a vendor as having a charge over goods upon contracting with the vendee, even before the vendor has been paid; a beneficiary as having a charge over the proceeds of an unauthorised disposition of trust property; and a trustee as having a charge over trust property in security of trustee fees and expenses.

Charges, particularly 'equitable charges', are sometimes synonymous with 'equitable liens'.

=== Hypothec ===
Hypothecation, or "trust receipts" are relatively uncommon forms of security interest whereby the underlying assets are pledged, not by delivery of the assets as in a conventional pledge, but by delivery of a document or other evidence of title. Hypothecation is usually seen in relation to bottomry (cf. bills of lading), whereby the bill of lading is endorsed by the secured party, who, unless the security is redeemed, can claim the property by delivery of the bill.

=== Conditional sale ===
Another form of security interest which flourished in the United States in the late 19th century and the first half of the 20th century was the conditional sale, the ancestor of what U.S. lawyers now call the purchase money security interest (PMSI). It was popular in that era among creditors for two reasons. First, most U.S. states had imposed numerous onerous restrictions upon chattel mortgages in order to protect debtors (at a time debtor's prisons were being abolished but were still within the memory of most persons then living), and second, all U.S. states in that era also had strict anti-usury laws. Conditional sales, at least initially, were seen to be free of both of those problems.

Under pressure from creditors and their lawyers, U.S. courts gradually developed a highly technical distinction between an absolute, unconditional sale, in which the seller simply became another unsecured creditor of the buyer, and a conditional sale, in which the sale of the goods was made dependent upon some condition (such as payment of the price in installments). Thus, the buyer's breach of a material condition, in turn, made it possible for the seller to declare the contract had ended, that the status quo ante should be restored, and to repossess the goods accordingly. Since the buyer had breached, he had forfeited his right to reimbursement of any portion of the price already paid, or in the alternative, those payments could be regarded as a crude form of rent for the use of the goods.

As conditional sales became popular for financing industrial equipment and consumer goods, U.S. state legislatures began to regulate them as well during the early 20th century, with the result that they soon became almost as complex as the older forms of security interests which they had been used to evade.

=== Quasi-securities ===
There are a number of other arrangements which parties can put in place which have the effect of conferring security in a commercial sense, but do not actually create a proprietary security interest in the assets. Whilst these techniques may provide protection for the secured party, they do not confer a proprietary interest in the assets which the arrangements relate to, and their effectiveness may be limited if the debtor goes into bankruptcy. For example, a party may outrightly transfer ownership of an asset to another party, with a contractual provision that the asset is re-transferred once the secured obligations are repaid. Alternatively, a creditor may retain ownership of an asset until the sum is paid in full. Trusts can also be employed or imposed for similar purposes as security interests.

=== Personal securities ===
Personal securities are security interests that do not grant the secured creditor any proprietary rights but merely personal rights, typically rights against a third party in the event of the debtor's non-performance. Personal securities are contractual, typically in the form of guarantees, sureties and indemnities, rather than proprietary or imposed by operation of law.

== Creditor priority ==
A key function of security interests is to allow courts to determine how assets should be distributed in the event of insolvency. Generally, once a company or person has become bankrupt or insolvent or liquidated and has to repay their creditors, the courts must determine which creditors will be paid and to what extent. Not only do secured creditors have an enforceable right (usually of seizure and sale) over the secured property upon default, but they also generally have priority over unsecured creditors.

The law governing priority (the term seniority is sometimes used in finance) between secured creditors themselves is itself extremely complex. Creditors can be further broken down into those having registered or "perfected" (in US law) their interests, as opposed to unregistered or unperfected interests; those having more senior debts, as opposed to junior or subordinate debts; those having beneficial or security interests; and preferential creditors, who may be either secured or unsecured, depending on context and jurisdiction.

General principles and maxims in the common law include nemo dat quod non habet (nobody can give that which they do not have); qui prior est tempore potior est jure (the first in time prevails); qui aequitatem petit, aequitatem facere debet (one who seeks equity must do equity); and that of the bona fide purchaser or holder in due course. The United States has a unique rule known as the absolute priority rule, which holds that senior creditors will be paid in full before junior creditors are paid anything.

== By jurisdiction ==
=== Common law ===
==== English law ====
"There are only four kinds of consensual security known to English law: (i) pledge; (ii) contractual lien; (iii) equitable charge and (iv) mortgage. A pledge and a contractual lien both depend upon the delivery of possession to the creditor. The difference between them is that in the case of a pledge the owner delivers possession to the creditor as security, whereas in the case of a lien the creditor retains a right of possession of goods previously delivered to him for some other purpose. Neither a mortgage or a charge depends upon the delivery of possession. The difference between them is that a mortgage involves a transfer of legal or equitable ownership to the creditor, whereas the equitable charge does not."

— Re Cosslet (Contractors) Ltd [1998] Ch 495 (CA), per Millett LJ

The creation of legal mortgages over land is governed by statute, which establishes two ways in which such mortgages can be created: by demise (i.e. conveyance of a leasehold interest), and by legal charge. Since 1926, statute has abolished the ability to create land mortgages by way of the mortgagor either conveying a fee simple to the mortgagee or assigning a leasehold to the mortgagee; the former is regarded as mortgage by demise with a term of 3000 years, while the latter is regarded as a mortgage by sub-demise with a term ten days less than the expressly assigned term. For most purposes, creation of a mortgage over land through either way results in largely similar legal effects. Since the Law of Property Act 1989, equitable mortgages can only be created where a written agreement has been made to create a legal mortgage and where the loan is advanced, even if the legal mortgage is not eventually created, for example, due to failure to meet the formality requirements, such as registration of a legal charge over registered land.

Security interests in English law
Classification	Type	Sub-type	Arises	Basis
Nonpossessory	Mortgage	Legal Mortgage	By agreement	Law
Nonpossessory	Mortgage	Statutory mortgage	By agreement	Law
Nonpossessory	Mortgage	Equitable mortgage	By agreement	Equity
Nonpossessory	Charge	Fixed charge	By agreement	Equity
Nonpossessory	Charge	Floating charge	By agreement	Equity
Possessory	Pledge		By agreement	Law
Possessory	Lien	Contractual lien	By agreement	Law
Possessory	Lien	Common law lien	By operation of law	Law
Possessory	Lien	Equitable lien	By operation of law	Equity
Possessory	Hypothecation / Trust receipt		By agreement	Equity

== See also ==
- Debenture
- Ship hypothec
- Mortgage law
- Negative pledge
- Nonrecourse debt
- Quistclose trust
- Second lien financing
- Secured transaction
- Tacking (law)
