= Verallia North America =

Glass packaging company owned by Ardagh Group

- Industry: Glass Production
- Founded: 1842
- Headquarters: Muncie, Indiana
- Products: Bottles, Jars
- Number of employees: 4,400
- Website: http://us.verallia.com/

Verallia North America, formerly the North American division of Verallia, is a glass packaging brand of the multinational company Ardagh Group. It produces more than nine billion glass bottles and jars per year, from thirteen plants located throughout the United States and is headquartered in Muncie, Indiana.

== History ==
Verallia North America can trace its roots in the United States back to 1842 when Joseph Foster started a glass factory in Stoddard, New Hampshire. This factory later grew into the Foster-Forbes Glass Company. In 1886 the Ball Brothers Glass Manufacturing Company became the Ball Corporation. In 1995, the two U.S. glass companies merged to become Ball-Foster Glass Container Company and formed a joint venture with Saint-Gobain. Within one year, Saint-Gobain had acquired the remaining interest in the joint venture. Ball-Foster Glass Container Company was renamed Saint-Gobain Containers in 2000. In 2010, Saint-Gobain Packaging launched the Verallia brand name worldwide. In April 2014, Ardagh Group purchased Verallia North America from Saint-Gobain.

== Production ==
All divisions of Verallia combine to produce 25 billion glass bottles and jars annually, from 58 industrial sites in 14 different counties. These locations employ approximately 15,500 people. Verallia North America accounts for 4,400 of these employees, 9 billion glass containers, and 13 manufacturing plants.

== Glass plant locations ==
- Dunkirk Indiana, 1889
- Port Allegany Pennsylvania, 1896
- Sapulpa Oklahoma, 1912
- Seattle Washington, 1931
- Lincoln Illinois, 1942
- Dolton Illinois, 1954
- Henderson North Carolina, 1960
- Burlington Wisconsin, 1965
- Ruston Louisiana, 1968
- Madera California, 1970
- Milford Massachusetts, 1973
- Wilson North Carolina, 1977
- Pevely Missouri, 1981

== Sustainability ==
Glass is 100% recyclable and can be recycled without loss in quality or purity. Recycled glass is referred to as cullet and is used in production of glass to reduce the amount of other materials used and reduce the amount of energy required. Cullet usually makes up 25% to 60% of the batch. Verallia North America has set a goal to make cullet account for 50% of all batches used in their production by 2013. Verallia North America has started the Captain Cullet and little Gob O'Glass campaign to spread awareness of glass recycling to children. This is an interactive project to educate the younger generation about the importance of recycling and includes activities such as a Virtual Education Program and animated cartoons.
