= Bottomry =

Arrangement in which the master of a ship borrows money using the ship as collateral

A bottomry, or bottomage, is an arrangement in which the master of a ship borrows money upon the bottom or keel of it, so as to forfeit the ship itself to the creditor, if the money with interest is not paid at the time appointed at the ship's safe return.

This occurs, for example, where the ship needs urgent repairs during the course of its voyage or some other emergency arises and it is not possible for the master to contact the owner to arrange funds, allowing the master to borrow money on the security of the ship or the cargo by executing a bond. Where the ship is hypothecated, the bond is called a bottomry bond. Where both the ship and its cargo are hypothecated, the relationship is called respondentia.

== History ==
Due to the bottomry bond's relatively low priority as against other liens in the event of a libel against the ship, the use of bottomry bonds declined greatly in the 19th century and the subject is today of interest only to legal historians.

The Code of Hammurabi describes a form of bottomry which is a risk transferring technique. A bottomry would be taken, but the repayment would be contingent on the ship successfully completing the voyage. This is more like a catastrophe bond than traditional insurance. In traditional insurance, you pay premiums and receive a benefit on the risk event. With bottomry and catastrophe bonds, you receive a loan up front and only pay it back with a premium if the risk event doesn't occur.

By its nature, bottomry was prone to insurance fraud. Two common forms were taking bottomry against a ship and valuable cargo, setting sail with a cheap cargo, and scuttling the ship to keep the loan and the cargo, and pretending that the ship had sunk while it actually hid in a distant port and acquired a new name and crew. Demosthenes's speech Against Zenothemis accuses the titular shipper of the first type of fraud in the fourth century BCE.

In his Life of Cato the Elder, Plutarch describes how he would use the process to make money, but calls it "the most disreputable form of money-lending". Kaplan and Kaplan describe it as follows:

Ship insurance springs naturally from the necessity of trade, the existence of sophisticated entrepots, and the rapacity of barbarians – all long-familiar facts of life on the Mediterranean. Its ancient Greek form, as described by Demosthenes, was what is now called by the splendid name of "bottomry". It was not a direct transfer of risk, but rather a conditional loan: The insurer staked the merchant to a sum of money in advance of the voyage, which was to be repaid with (considerable) interest if the voyage succeeded – but forgiven if the vessel was lost. It is an arrangement that is easy to describe but difficult to characterize: not a pure loan, because the lender accepts part of the risk; not a partnership, because the money to be repaid is specified; not pure insurance, because it does not specifically secure the risk to the merchant's goods. It is perhaps best considered as a futures contract: the insurer has bought an option on the venture's final value.

== Respondentia ==
Respondentia is a loan where a ship's cargo is the security, on similar terms to bottomry.

== See also ==
- Hypothec
- Mortgage
- Security interest
- Mechanic's lien
