= Bankers' Books Evidence Act, 2026 =

Indian law governing the evidentiary use of banking records

Parliament of India
- Long title: An Act to provide for law relating to evidence with respect to bankers' books and to align it with contemporary digital banking practices and for matters connected therewith or incidental thereto.
- Citation: Act No. 15 of 2026
- Enacted by: Lok Sabha
- Enacted: 5 August 2026
- Enacted by: Rajya Sabha
- Enacted: 10 August 2026
- Assented to: 13 August 2026
- Commenced: 1 October 2026

Legislative history

Initiating chamber: Lok Sabha
- Bill title: Bankers' Books Evidence Bill, 2026
- Introduced by: Nirmala Sitharaman
- Introduced: 3 August 2026

Repeals
- Bankers' Books Evidence Act, 1891
- Status: Not yet in force

The Bankers' Books Evidence Act, 2026 is an Act of the Parliament of India governing the use of banking records as evidence in legal proceedings. It was enacted to replace the Bankers' Books Evidence Act, 1891 and to update the evidentiary framework for banking records maintained using electronic, digital, virtual and cloud-based systems.

The Act received the assent of the President of India on 13 August 2026 as Act No. 15 of 2026. The Central Government subsequently appointed 1 October 2026 as the date on which the Act would come into force. Until that date, the 1891 Act continues to govern the subject.

The legislation retains the earlier principle that a properly certified copy of an entry in a banker's books may be received as prima facie evidence instead of requiring production of the original record. It expands and standardises the framework for records maintained in modern computer systems and sets out specific conditions intended to establish the integrity and accuracy of electronic and digital banking records.

== Background ==
The Bankers' Books Evidence Act, 1891 was enacted during British rule to simplify the proof of entries contained in banks' books. It allowed certified copies of banking entries to be admitted in evidence without routinely requiring banks to produce their original books in court.

The 1891 Act was subsequently amended to accommodate technological changes. The Information Technology Act, 2000 amended the definitions of "bankers' books" and "certified copy" and introduced provisions dealing with computer-generated banking records. Further amendments made by the Negotiable Instruments (Amendment and Miscellaneous Provisions) Act, 2002 referred expressly to records stored on microfilm, magnetic tape and other mechanical or electronic data-retrieval mechanisms, including records held at backup and disaster-recovery sites.

According to the statement accompanying the 2026 Bill, the government considered the existing framework inadequate for a banking system in which records were increasingly created, stored and maintained through contemporary technology. The new legislation is intended to establish a more technology-neutral framework and standardize the certification of banking records thereby bringing in consistency while accommodating evolving banking technologies.

== Legislative history ==
Finance Minister Nirmala Sitharaman introduced the Bankers' Books Evidence Bill, 2026 in the Lok Sabha on 3 August 2026.

The Lok Sabha passed the Bill by voice vote on 5 August 2026. The vote took place without a substantive debate amid disruptions and protests by opposition members.

The Rajya Sabha passed the Bill on 10 August 2026, also by voice vote. It received presidential assent on 13 August and was published in the Gazette of India on the same day.

On 10 September 2026, the Department of Financial Services issued a notification appointing 1 October 2026 as the commencement date for the Act.

== Provisions ==
=== Bankers' books ===
Section 2 adopts a broad definition of "bankers' books". It includes ledgers, day-books, cash-books, account books and other records used in the ordinary course of a bank's business, whether maintained physically or using electronic, digital or other data-storage mechanisms. The definition expressly covers records stored onsite, offsite, at virtual or cloud locations, and at backup or disaster-recovery sites.

For the purposes of the Act, a bank or banker includes a company or corporation carrying on banking business, post office savings banks and money order offices, as well as other financial-sector entities to which the Central Government may extend the Act.

=== Certification of banking records ===
Section 3 provides separate certification requirements for records maintained in physical form and those stored electronically or digitally. A certified physical record must, among other things, state that the copy is true and correct and that the underlying entry was made in the ordinary course of the bank's business.

For electronically or digitally maintained records, the certificate must include particulars concerning the computer system or device used to produce the record and address the statutory conditions relating to its reliability and integrity. Certificates may be signed manually or authenticated using a digital or electronic signature by the branch head, office head or another duly authorised bank officer.

The Act contains prescribed certificate formats in its First and Second Schedules. The Central Government may modify the formats by notification.

=== Evidentiary value ===
Section 5 provides that a certified copy of an entry in a banker's book is to be received as prima facie evidence of the existence of the entry and of the matters, transactions and accounts recorded in it, to the same extent as the original entry would otherwise be admissible.

The provision does not make a certified bank record conclusive evidence; its evidentiary value remains subject to the ordinary process of challenge and evaluation in the proceeding.

=== Electronic and digital records ===
Section 6 provides that a banking record cannot be denied admissibility merely because it is electronic or digital. Its admissibility, validity and enforceability are subject to the conditions set out in section 7.

Those conditions include requirements concerning the regular use and proper functioning of the relevant computer system or communication device, the ordinary-course entry of information, the accuracy of the copy, safeguards against unauthorised alteration, the integrity of data transfers and the absence of detected tampering. The provision also refers to the security of networks, devices and data against cyber risks or threats.

Where several computer systems, networks, devices or intermediaries are involved in creating, storing or processing banking information over a period, section 7 permits them to be treated as a single computer system or communication device for the purposes of the Act.

=== Production of records and appearance of bank officials ===
The Act continues the principle that, where a bank is not itself a party to a proceeding, its officers ordinarily cannot be compelled to produce bankers' books or appear as witnesses merely to prove the transactions recorded in them.

Under section 8, a court may nevertheless require such production or appearance for a "special cause", which must be recorded in writing. The Act defines special cause to include circumstances in which the accuracy or genuineness of an entry is doubtful, the ordinary process of record-keeping appears to have been interrupted, or the bank has failed to comply with an order concerning inspection of its records.

Section 9 allows a court, on the application of a party, to permit inspection and copying of relevant entries or to direct the bank to prepare and produce certified copies. Unless the court directs otherwise, the order is to be served on the bank at least three clear days before compliance is required.

=== Investigations and inquiries ===
Section 11 deals with the application of provisions concerning production, inspection and costs to investigations or inquiries falling within the Act's definition of a legal proceeding. In such cases, references to an order of the court under sections 8, 9 and 10 are construed as references to an order made by an officer not below the rank of Superintendent of Police, or another officer specified by the appropriate government.

A broadly comparable mechanism existed under section 8 of the 1891 Act. During discussion of the 2026 legislation, however, the provision attracted attention because of the greater scale and ease with which contemporary digital banking information can be accessed and reproduced.

=== Application to other financial entities ===
Section 4 authorises the Central Government to extend the provisions of the Act, by notification, to an entity or class of entities operating in the financial sector. Such an extension may be made subject to specified conditions, exceptions or modifications.

According to the government the provision was intended to allow the evidentiary framework to adapt to changes in the financial sector beyond conventional banking institutions.

=== Repeal and savings ===
Section 16 repeals the Bankers' Books Evidence Act, 1891 upon commencement of the 2026 Act. It contains savings for rights, liabilities, investigations, proceedings, certificates, notifications and other matters arising under the repealed legislation.

Proceedings instituted under the 1891 Act before, on or after the commencement of the 2026 Act in respect of matters saved by the provision may continue under the repealed enactment as if it had not been repealed. Section 16 also applies section 6 of the General Clauses Act, 1897 to the effect of the repeal.

== Reception and criticism ==
The legislation is being considered a long overdue attempt to modernise a nineteenth-century evidentiary framework for contemporary digital banking. Legal practitioners cited by The Indian Express welcomed the introduction of standardised certification requirements and the clearer treatment of electronic banking records, which they said could reduce the need for bank officials to appear in routine litigation.

The Bill when promulgated also resulted in discussions about financial privacy and the extent of safeguards surrounding access to customers' digital banking information. Some legal commentators argued that the ease with which electronic records can be copied and transmitted increases the consequences of investigative access to banking data. Concerns were also raised about the absence of some technical mechanisms, such as the express use of cryptographic hash values, to assist in verifying whether a digital record has been altered.

Other commentators noted that the authority given to senior police officers in investigations was not wholly new, since the 1891 Act contained a comparable provision. As a result, much of the discussion focused on whether protections developed under the 1891 Act remained adequate in an era when banking records are largely digital and can be copied almost instantly.

== Relationship with other evidence law ==
Section 2 of the Act provides that expressions used but not separately defined in it are to carry the meanings assigned to them under the Arbitration and Conciliation Act, 1996, the Information Technology Act, 2000, the Bharatiya Nagarik Suraksha Sanhita, 2023 and the Bharatiya Sakshya Adhiniyam, 2023.

The Act therefore operates as a specialised evidentiary statute dealing with bankers' books within India's wider framework governing documentary and electronic evidence.

== See also ==
- Bankers' Books Evidence Act, 1891
- Bharatiya Sakshya Adhiniyam, 2023
- Information Technology Act, 2000
- Banking Regulation Act, 1949
- Electronic evidence
