= Eurohypothec =

The Eurohypothec can be defined as a "common mortgage for Europe"; that is, a common mortgage instrument to secure loans transnationally and European-wide. Another (but improper) way in calling it is "Euromortgage".

It is currently a research project undertaken by several researchers European-wide. The Eurohypothec has appeared for the first time in an official document of the European Union in the Green Paper about the Mortgage Credit in the EU and has found a degree of acceptance among the European mortgage market stakeholders, scientific authors and authorities.

== History ==
The Eurohypothec idea was already conceived by Prof. Claudio Segré during the 1960s and was further developed by other institutions like the International Union of Latin Notaries, until our days in which researchers like Dr. Wehrens and Dr. O. Stöcker have pushed forward the idea.

== Objectives ==
The objective of the Eurohypothec is to create a pan European, flexible and secure mortgage instrument that allows as many businesses as possible in a trans-national way: syndicated loans, securitisation, efficient covered/mortgage bonds business, etc. It also brings advantages to mortgagors, who would be able to change their credit institutions more efficiently, fast and cheaply.

== Model ==
The model has been developed by a pool of researchers and practitioners, mainly devoted to private law matters and the result was condensed in the so-called "Basic Guidelines for a Eurohypothec", which were published in Warsaw in 2005.

Its main features are:

- Right in rem to secure one or more obligations/loans between the borrower and the same or different lenders.
- It does not substitute national mortgages.
- No need of obligation/loan to exist.
- It may secure as many obligations/loans as mortgagor and mortgagee want to.
- Contractual relationship between the mortgage and the credit/loan through a so-called "security agreement"

The Basic Guidelines model has helped to develop the changes in mortgage law legislation in France (2007) and the Law Project in Spain (2007).

Related instruments to the Eurohypothec are the Eurotrust and the Eurotitle.
