= Ardagh Group =

Luxembourg-based producer of glass and metal products

Ardagh Group S.A.

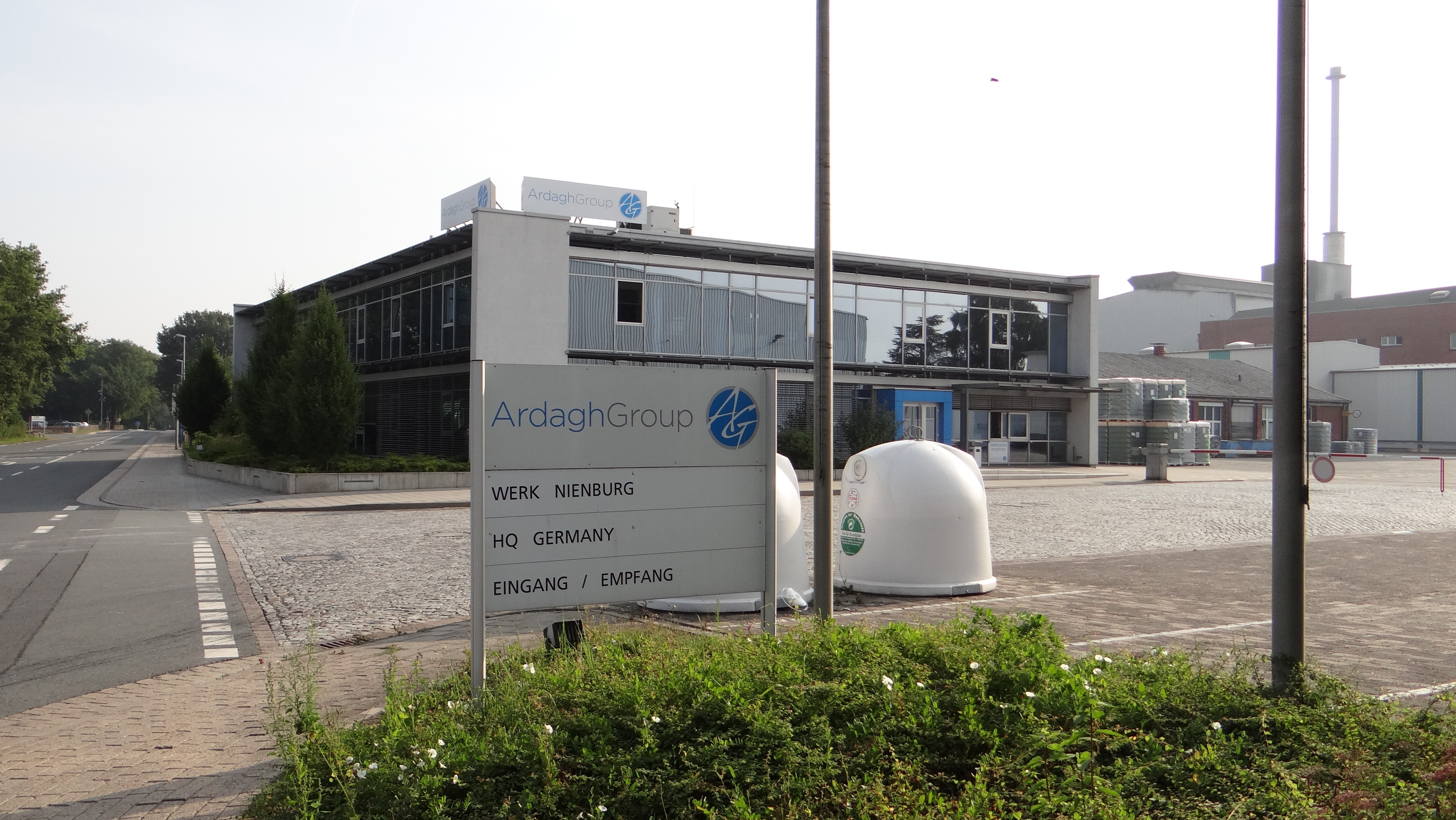
- Ardagh Group site in Nienburg, Germany
- Type: Public
- Traded as: NYSE: AMBP (Class A); Russell 2000 component
- Industry: Packaging
- Founded: 1932; 94 years ago in Dublin
- Headquarters: Luxembourg, Luxembourg
- Number of locations: 109
- Key people: Paul Coulson (Chairman & CEO)
- Products: Glass and Metal Packaging
- Revenue: ▲€7,646M (FY 2016)
- Total assets: ▲€10,261M (FY 2016)
- Number of employees: Approx. 23,500 (FY 2016) (2016)
- Website: www.ardaghgroup.com

Ardagh Group is a producer of glass and metal products founded in Ireland and now based in Luxembourg, which has "grown in the past two decades into one of the world’s largest metal and glass packaging companies".

As of 2012, the company operated 89 facilities in 22 countries, employed approximately 23,500 people, and had approximately €7.7 billion in revenue.

== History ==
Founded in 1932 as the Irish Glass Bottle Company in Dublin, the company expanded through a series of acquisitions after Paul Coulson acquired an initial stake in the company in 1998. In North America, the company currently operates two of the oldest continuously operated glass container plants in the country: Dunkirk, Indiana, opened in 1889, and Winchester, Indiana, opened in 1898.

It purchased Rockware Glass in 1999. In 2011, it purchased the metal packaging company Impress Group for €1.7 billion and Fi Par for €125 million. In August 2012, the company acquired Anchor Glass Container Corporation for $880 million. In 2013, Ardagh Group agreed to acquire St-Gobain's Verallia North America for €1.3 billion. In 2012, it purchased the Rexam Glass Division.

The company launched an initial public offering (IPO) in March 2017 on the New York Stock Exchange, raising just over $300 million.

In 2022, Ardagh Group successfully concluded its strategic acquisition of Consol Glass, Africa, now known as Ardagh Glass Packaging – Africa (AGP – A).
