= William J. Bernstein =

American financial theorist and neurologist (born 1948)

William J. Bernstein (born 1948) is an American financial theorist and neurologist. His research is in the field of modern portfolio theory and he has published books for individual investors who wish to manage their own equity portfolios, as well as history. He lives in Portland, Oregon. His bestselling books include The Birth of Plenty and A Splendid Exchange.

== Biography ==
Bernstein is a proponent of the equity or index allocation school of thought, believing that all equity selection strategies should be focused on allocating between asset classes, rather than selecting individual stocks and bonds, or from the timing of their sales. Bernstein's first book, The Intelligent Asset Allocator, makes this case in detail; his second book, The Four Pillars of Investing: Lessons for Building a Winning Portfolio (McGraw-Hill, 2002; ISBN 0-07-138529-0), is aimed for those less comfortable with statistical thought. It also puts asset-class returns into long-term historical perspective. A second edition, updated for recent market history and research, was published in 2023. It covers the theory, history, psychology (including behavioral finance) and business of investing, meaning how the financial industry operates.

Bernstein is a proponent of modern portfolio theory, which stands in stark contrast to the view that skilled managers can succeed in picking particular investments that will outperform the market, whether through market timing, momentum investing, or finding assets whose future value have been underestimated by the market. He argues that the financial research literature shows that most return is determined by the asset allocation of the portfolio rather than by asset selection.

In 1996, Bernstein introduced Coward's Portfolio, a popular form of lazy portfolio. He explained "a rational coward might split their equity exposure equally between S&P, EAFE, US small, and foreign small stocks." A contemporary implementation of the Portfolio includes 40% short-term bonds, and 15% international equity evenly divided into Europe, Pacific, and emerging markets funds.

Bernstein's third book, The Birth of Plenty, is a history of the world's standard of living; it proposes four conditions that have historically been necessary for it to rise. His fourth book, A Splendid Exchange: How Trade Shaped the World, published in 2008 by Grove Atlantic, is a history of trade. In 2009 his fifth book, The Investor's Manifesto: Preparing for Prosperity, Armageddon, and Everything in Between, was published, which continues the theme of asset allocation in a more accessible way.

In 2014, his sixth book, Rational Expectations: Asset Allocation for Investing Adults, was published. It updated his earlier books on investing to cover the position after the 2008 financial crisis, and the most recent research on investing, including that by Elroy Dimson, Paul Marsh, and Mike Staunton, authors of Triumph of the Optimists.

In 2017, he was awarded the James R. Vertin Award from CFA Institute, which is given to individuals who produce valuable research to investment professionals.

Bernstein holds a PhD in chemistry and an MD; he practiced neurology until retiring from the field.

== Bibliography ==
- The Intelligent Asset Allocator: How to Build Your Portfolio to Maximize Returns and Minimize Risk. McGraw-Hill, New York, 2000, ISBN 0-07-136236-3.
- The Four Pillars of Investing: Lessons for Building a Winning Portfolio. McGraw-Hill, New York, 2002, ISBN 0-07-138529-0.
- The Birth of Plenty: How the Prosperity of the Modern World was Created. McGraw-Hill, New York, 2004, ISBN 0-07-142192-0.
- A Splendid Exchange: How Trade Shaped the World from Prehistory to Today. Atlantic Books, London, 2008, ISBN 978-1-84354-668-9.
- The Investor's Manifesto: Preparing for Prosperity, Armageddon, and Everything in Between. Wiley, New York, 2009, ISBN 978-0-470-50514-4.
- Masters of the Word: How Media Shaped History. Grove, 2013, ISBN 978-0-802-12138-7.
- Rational Expectations: Asset Allocation for Investing Adults. 2013, ISBN 978-0-9887803-2-3.
- If You Can: How Millennials Can Get Rich Slowly. Portland, Oregon: Efficient Frontier Publications, 2014, ISBN 978-0988780330
- The Delusions of Crowds: Why People Go Mad in Groups. Atlantic Monthly Press, New York, 2021, ISBN 978-0802157096.
- The Four Pillars of Investing, Second Edition: Lessons for Building a Winning Portfolio. McGraw-Hill, New York, 2023, ISBN 978-1-264-71591-6.
