= The Birth of Plenty =

2004 book by William J. Bernstein

The Birth of Plenty: How the Prosperity of the Modern World Was Created
- Author: William Bernstein
- Language: English
- Subject: History
- Publisher: Wiley
- Publication date: August 11, 2004
- Publication place: United States
- Media type: Print (Hardcover and Paperback) and audio-CD
- Pages: 400
- ISBN: 0471270474

The Birth of Plenty: How the Prosperity of the Modern World Was Created is a nonfiction book on world history and economics by American author William J. Bernstein.

== Summary ==
The Birth of Plenty is a history of the world expressed in economic terms. Bernstein argues that in order to prosper, a country must possess four main attributes: property rights, the scientific rationalism, capital markets and an effective means of transportation and communications. After establishing these as the basic requirements for economic success, the book examines the historical progress of a number of countries both with and without these attributes. Bernstein further argues that the four attributes are a necessary precursor to democracy.

== Reception ==
Publishers Weekly described the book as, "authoritative... accessible and thoroughly entertaining". It also received positive reviews in the economic and investment community.

== See also ==
- A Splendid Exchange
