= Paul Coulson =

Irish billionaire

- Born: Paul Richard Coulson
- Education: Trinity College Dublin
- Occupation: Businessman
- Known for: Largest shareholder and chairman of Ardagh Group

Paul Richard Coulson is an Irish billionaire, who is the largest shareholder and chairman of Ardagh Group. In 2021, his fortune was estimated to be $2.8 billion, making him Ireland's 10th most wealthy person.

== Education ==
Coulson received a bachelor's degree in business studies from Trinity College Dublin in 1973. He qualified as a chartered accountant in 1978, after five years spent with Price Waterhouse, and is an FCA.

== Career ==
In 1982, Coulson founded an investment and aircraft leasing firm company, Yeoman International Group Limited.

In 1998, he bought a stake in the Irish Glass Bottle Company and transformed it into Ardagh Group.
