= Rockware Glass =

UK company manufacturing glass containers

Rockware Glass is a UK company manufacturing glass containers.

The company has a works at Doncaster, South Yorkshire, Worksop, Nottinghamshire, Knottingley West Yorkshire and Irvine, Scotland. Rockware became part of Ardagh Glass Group in 2006.

Rockware's former works by the Grand Union Canal in Greenford, London, were developed from W.A.Bailey's glassworks, founded in 1900, and Purex lead works. By 1959 Rockware employed 1,220 people on a 14 hectare (35 acre) site.

In 1968, Rockware acquired the former Forster's Glass Company of St Helens, Lancashire.

The Greenford works closed in 1973 and is commemorated by Rockware Avenue.
