= Structural subordination =

In corporate finance, structural subordination is the concept that a lender to a company will not have access to the assets of the company's subsidiary until after all of the subsidiary's creditors have been paid and the remaining assets have been distributed up to the company as an equity holder. For example, if a lender lends money to a parent company, then that lender is structurally subordinated to a lender who lent money to a subsidiary of the parent. The lender to the subsidiary is structurally senior, and the lender to the parent can only be repaid from the assets of the subsidiary after the lender to the subsidiary has been repaid.
