= Subordinated debt =

Financial product

In finance, subordinated debt (also known as subordinated loan, subordinated bond, subordinated debenture or junior debt) is debt which ranks after other debts if a company falls into liquidation or bankruptcy.

Such debt is referred to as 'subordinate', because the debt providers (the lenders) have subordinate status in relationship to the normal debt.

Subordinated debt has a lower priority than other bonds of the issuer in case of liquidation during bankruptcy, and ranks below: the liquidator, government tax authorities and senior debt holders in the hierarchy of creditors. Debt instruments with the lowest seniority are known as subordinated debt instruments.

Because subordinated debts are only repayable after other debts have been paid, they are riskier for the lender of the money. The debts may be secured or unsecured. Subordinated loans typically have a lower credit rating, and, therefore, a higher yield than senior debt.

A typical example for this would be when a promoter of a company invests money in the form of debt rather than in the form of stock. In the case of liquidation (e.g. the company winds up its affairs and dissolves), the promoter would be paid just before stockholders — assuming there are assets to distribute after all other liabilities and debts have been paid.

While subordinated debt may be issued in a public offering, major shareholders and parent companies are more frequent buyers of subordinated loans. These entities may prefer to inject capital in the form of debt, but, due to the close relationship to the issuing company, they may be more willing to accept a lower rate of return on subordinated debt than general investors would.

== Examples ==
A particularly important example of subordinated bonds can be found in bonds issued by banks. Before the 2008 financial crisis, subordinated debt was issued periodically by most large banking corporations in the U.S. Subsequently the private credit middle-market increased debt issuance. Subordinated debt can be expected to be especially risk-sensitive because subordinated debt holders have claims on bank assets only after senior debtholders and they lack the upside gain enjoyed by shareholders.

This status of subordinated debt makes it perfect for experimenting with the significance of market discipline, via the signaling effect of secondary market prices of subordinated debt (and, where relevant, the issue price of these bonds initially in the primary markets).

From the perspective of policy-makers and regulators, the potential benefit from having banks issue subordinated debt is that the markets and their information-generating capabilities are enrolled in the "supervision" of the financial condition of the banks. This, hopefully, creates both an early-warning system, like the so-called "canary in the mine", and, also hopefully, an incentive for bank management to act prudently, thus helping to offset the moral hazard that can otherwise exist, especially in a circumstance where banks have limited equity and deposits are insured.

This role of subordinated debt has attracted increasing attention from policy analysts in recent years.

For a second example of subordinated debt, consider asset-backed securities. These are often issued in tranches. The senior tranches get paid back first; the subordinated tranches later.

A third example is mezzanine debt.

== Use ==
Subordinated bonds are regularly issued (as mentioned earlier) as part of the securitization of debt, such as in the issue of asset-backed securities, collateralized mortgage obligations or collateralized debt obligations. Corporate issuers tend to prefer not to issue subordinated bonds because of the higher interest rate required to compensate for the higher risk, but may be forced to do so if indentures on earlier issues mandate their status as senior bonds.

Also, subordinated debt may be combined with preferred stock to create so-called monthly income preferred stock, a hybrid security paying dividends for the lender and funded as interest expense by the issuer.

== See also ==
- Tier 2 capital
- Basel II
- Bank condition
- Banking regulation
- CAMELS rating
- Perpetual subordinated debt
- Structural subordination
