= Floating note =

Floating note may refer to:

- Message in a bottle

== See also ==
- Adjustable-rate mortgage
- Drifter (floating device)
- Floater (disambiguation)
- Floating rate (disambiguation)
- Floating rate note
- Inverse floating rate note
