= Real estate derivative =

Financial instrument

A real estate derivative is a financial instrument whose value is based on the price of real estate. The core uses for real estate derivatives are: hedging positions, pre-investing assets and re-allocating a portfolio. The major products within real estate derivatives are: swaps, futures contracts, options (calls and puts) and structured products. Each of these products can use a different real estate index. Further, each property type and region can be used as a reference point for any real estate derivative.

== Applications ==
=== Swap ===
The most basic form of real estate derivative is a swap transaction, in which one investor, or one side, goes long and the other side goes short (finance). An investor would want to execute a swap if they thought that the market, or sector, was likely to appreciate, in which case they would go long. Alternatively, if an investor's view was that the market would depreciate from that point, they would go short, or take the other side of that trade.

=== Options ===
One can apply options to real estate. A real estate Option is a contract based on a time horizon and an expected property value. It is developed based on financial options contracts and adopted to individual real estate assets.

==== Call ====
With the real estate call option, the property owner can sell an option in exchange for debt-free cash today. Investor, who buys the real estate call option benefits from property price appreciation and price volatility.

==== Put ====
With the real estate put option (selling price decline insurance), the investor can sell an option thus the investor underwrites price decline insurance. The property owner, who buys the option, is protected against price decline of the property.

== Derivative efficiencies ==
Owning real estate assets is costly, and the transaction costs associated with purchasing commercial real estate can be prohibitive. Typical transaction costs can equal 500 - 800 basis points per transaction. Industry estimates suggest that transaction costs for commercial real estate easily surpass $10–$12 billion annually. Since the US real estate derivative market is new, the transaction costs are at this point variable. However, based on derivatives in other markets, it is anticipated that the costs will be well below the 500-800 basis points required to invest in actual real estate.

== Market growth ==
The market for real estate derivatives was long overdue. Real Estate is the only major asset class that only recently developed a derivatives market. According to the Pension Real Estate Association's Plan Sponsor Research Report, pension funds allocate approximately 6.0% of their assets to real estate, making it one of the largest investable asset classes, after equities and fixed income. Because of the significant transactions costs involved with investing in real estate, derivatives can, but also might not, improve the efficiency of the market.

=== United States ===
The market for US real estate derivatives, while in a nascent stage, made significant progress in 2007. There are now a diverse set of indices and methodologies being used to create and structure real estate derivatives, for both residential and commercial real estate.

=== United Kingdom ===
In the UK, the market for property derivatives did not begin until 2004. However, since the market's inception, the growth has been significant. Through the third quarter of 2007, trades with an outstanding notional value of 7.9 billion pounds have been executed. The U.S. market is still emerging, and has been limited somewhat over the last year by the global credit crunch and uncertain values of mortgage-backed securities. However, the market in the U.S. is now emerging quickly, with over $500 million worth of transactions to date in 2007.

=== Australia ===
Taking the AUD 139.5 billion in Australian residential and commercial property sales recorded in 2006, and applying a 1-to-1 derivatives-to-underlying ratio, the potential PD market would be larger than the $89 billion Australian credit derivatives market. A 2-to-1 ratio would make it more active than the $215 billion interest rate options sector, and a 3-to-1 ratio would put it within reach of the $472 billion ASX options industry.

RP Data-Rismark indices is regarded as the market leader of Australia's Property Derivatives Market.
