= Phillip Khan =

Hong Kong businessman and political activist

Chinese name
- Traditional Chinese: 簡浩名
- Yale Romanization: Gáan Houhmìhng

Urdu name
- Urdu: عبدالغفار خان

Abdull Ghafar Khan, better known as Phillip Khan, is a Hong Kong businessman and political activist. A Pakistani national born and raised in Hong Kong, Khan's ambitions to stand for election to the city's Legislative Council reportedly have been blocked by the refusal of the Hong Kong Immigration Department to consider his application for naturalisation as a Chinese national.

== Early life ==
Khan concurrently holds Pakistani nationality and British National (Overseas) status. His father came to Hong Kong in 1915, when the city was still ruled by the British Empire. His uncle served in the Hong Kong Police Force, and was killed in a bombing in 1944 during World War II. After the war, his father settled in Diamond Hill, where he ran a dairy farm. Khan studied at the former Mansfield College in Knutsford Terrace, Tsim Sha Tsui; he was the only member of his class not of Chinese ethnicity, and thus became fluent in Cantonese. He graduated in 1976. During the 1980s, when the wave of emigration from Hong Kong was reaching its peak, Khan made the decision to remain in Hong Kong, stating that he saw it as his home. He runs a trading company, due to which he travels frequently to Shenzhen for business and speaks Mandarin Chinese as well.

== 2008 Minibond protests ==
Khan suffered financial losses in the September 2008 bankruptcy of Lehman Brothers due to his investments in so-called "Minibonds" – structured financial products similar to equity-linked notes which were marketed to many members of the Hong Kong public with claims of being a safe and low-risk product. In the aftermath, he became involved in efforts to gain compensation for affected noteholders. In November 2008, Khan organised a protest march from Sogo Department Store in Causeway Bay to the Central Government Offices in Central; attendees shouted slogans calling for then-Chief Executive of Hong Kong Donald Tsang to step down and criticising the opacity of the banks' operations. The following month, when former US president Bill Clinton visited Hong Kong for the first annual meeting of the Clinton Foundation, Khan organised protests outside of the Grand Hyatt Hong Kong where Clinton was staying, in an attempt to draw attention to the issue. Roughly 90 people attended the protests.

Khan continued leading protest activities throughout 2009 and 2010. In January 2009, Khan and four fellow protestors collected signatures from over two thousand affected noteholders and set off for neighbouring Macau to submit a petition to then-Vice-President of the People's Republic of China Xi Jinping, who was visiting the city. In 2010, after Standard Chartered admitted that they had made errors in estimating the risk associated with Minibonds, Khan led a protest outside of the Legislative Council Building, during which he stood in the middle of the street in an attempt to block a Standard Chartered company bus from departing the scene.

== Naturalisation attempts ==
Khan has twice attempted to submit applications to the Hong Kong Immigration Department for naturalisation as a Chinese national; however, each time, the immigration officer on duty refused to accept his papers, stating that he did not have a close relative who was a Chinese national. According to an Immigration Department spokesperson, applications will be taken from all persons submitting them, but under the Chinese Nationality (Miscellaneous Provisions) Ordinance (Cap. 540) § 5, the Department is not required to inform the applicant of the reason for rejection. His inability to naturalise has also meant he cannot obtain a Home Return Permit for travel to mainland China; instead, he has to use his passport, waiting in line at immigration control at Luohu Port for more than half an hour each time and quickly running out of pages for passport stamps, requiring him to pay additional fees to add pages to his passport or renew it.

News of Khan's troubles prompted Equal Opportunities Commission Chairman Lam Woon-kwong to write a letter of concern to the Immigration Department. In December 2012, Khan organised public protests over the issue, marching and holding signs at the Central Government Complex in Tamar with roughly twenty other South Asians whose applications for naturalisation had similarly been rejected.

== Other activities ==
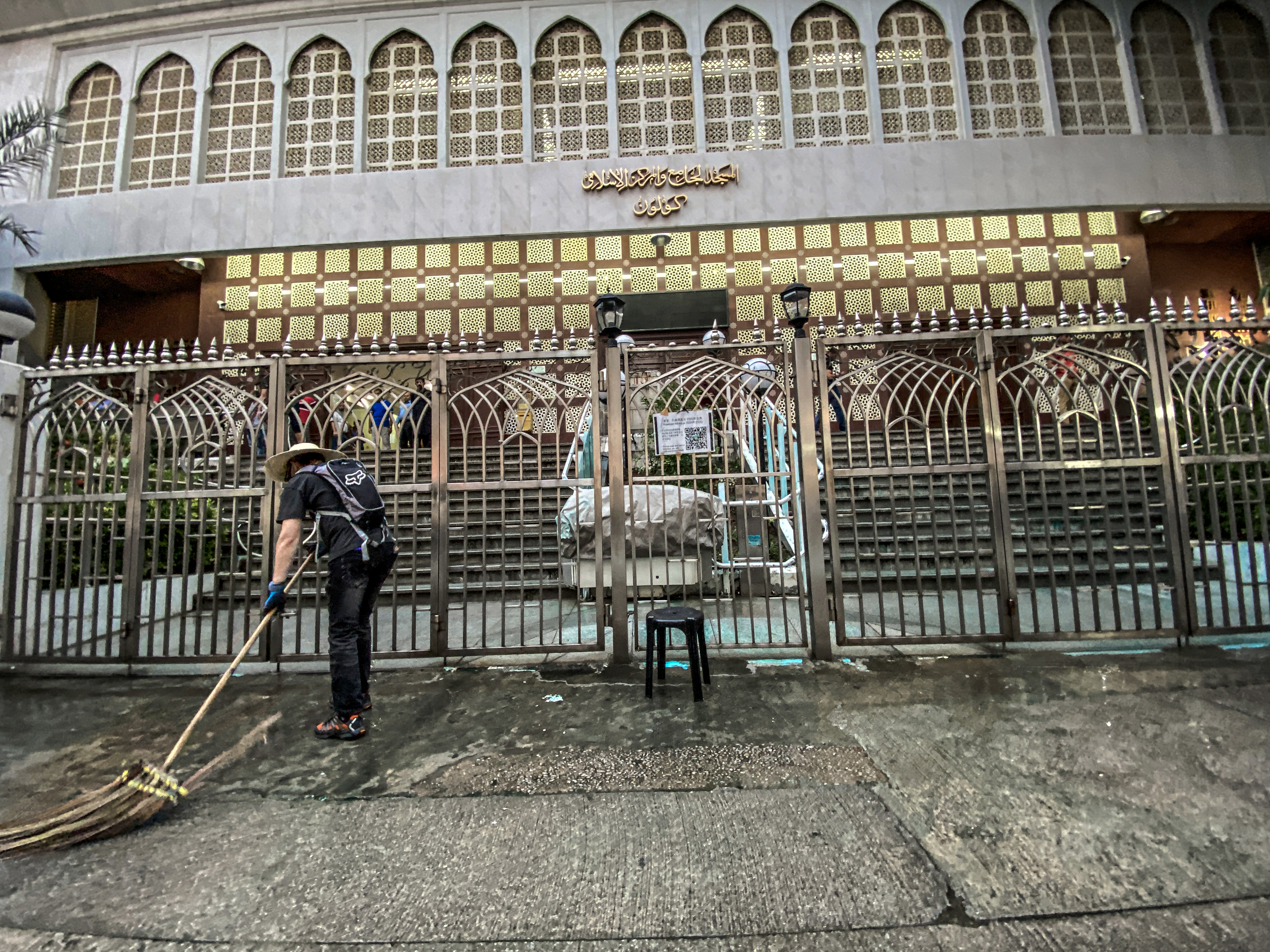
Exterior of Kowloon Masjid on 20 October 2019, following the water cannon spraying

In the early 2000s, Khan participated in a number of Hong Kong political activities, including the Hong Kong 1 July marches against Basic Law Article 23 security legislation, as well as candlelight vigils in Victoria Park in memory of the Tiananmen Square protests of 1989. He has also spoken out against the Hong Kong Education Bureau's refusal to develop a local Chinese-as-a-second-language curriculum for students from non-Chinese-speaking households.

In October 2019, during the anti-extradition bill protests, after an attack on Civil Human Rights Front convenor Jimmy Sham by five unidentified men of South Asian ethnicity, online messages called for retaliatory attacks on the Kowloon Masjid and Islamic Centre, and Khan and several other Muslims were standing outside the masjid to protect it when police sprayed blue-dyed water on them and the masjid. Khan rejected police descriptions of the spraying as accidental and stated it was an "insult to Islam". Khan, along with then-Legislative Council member Jeremy Tam and Indian Association of Hong Kong president Mohan Chugani, subsequently filed a report with the Complaints Against Police Office regarding the spraying.

Khan unsuccessfully ran for a seat on Yau Tsim Mong District Council, in Tsim Sha Tsui West constituency, during the November 2019 local elections.
