= Minibond =

Minibond are not bonds, but financial derivatives based on credit default swaps (CDS), which are high-risk financial investment products. They were a brand name for a series of structured financial notes issued in Hong Kong and Singapore under control of Lehman Brothers. The name was also used for other likewise structured Notes, namely Constellation Notes and Octave Notes, respectively issued in Hong Kong under the direction of DBS Bank and Morgan Stanley.

Some countries prohibit or restrict the sale of CDS to non-professional investors. However, in many regions in Asia, banks sell them on behalf of others. In addition, banks to sell products to retired people, familiar neighbors, etc. in order to gain sizable commissions leading to possible misselling. Most investors do not read the terms of sale in detail and get the impression that mini-bonds are capital-guaranteed and low-risk investments.

In 2008, these Minibonds led to the Lehman Brothers mini-bond affair, where as a result of Lehman Brothers bankruptcy the value of its minibonds plummeted, and problems gradually emerged for its investors.

== Lehman Brothers mini-bond affair ==
=== Release ===
From 2002 to 2003, Lehman Brothers issued mini-bonds in Hong Kong to non-institutional investors (also known as retail clients). As the sponsor, Lehman Brothers was responsible for the design of the product and requested credit ratings from rating agencies for the assets secured in the mini-bonds (commonly known as the CDO portion). Since Lehman Brothers was not a commercial bank and did not have a sales platform for non-institutional investors, Lehman Brothers has a sales relationships with a number of banks. The banks introduced and promoted the products and sold them to customers through retail networks. In return, Lehman Brothers paid the bank a commission on sales.

=== Structure ===
Each mini-bond was generally issued in both US dollars and local currency (such as Hong Kong dollars), with a term of 3, 5 or 7 years and a fixed coupon payment. For investors, the main risk they faced was the credit risk of bond assets. First, minibonds are linked to the credit of several well-known companies (banks), and if one of them defaults on its debt, the minibonds will also cease to pay. Secondly, the principal of the mini-bond will be used to purchase synthetic debt securities (CDO Notes) as collateral assets. In the absence of CDO default, The principal is paid at maturity, but if a default occurs, the minibond will also not payout.

=== Lehman Brothers bankruptcy ===
After the subprime mortgage crisis began in 2007 it affected almost all financial institutions. By the summer of 2008, Lehman Brothers was also in crisis and filed for bankruptcy protection on 15 September. In Hong Kong, the issue of repayment of minibonds has suddenly become the focus of attention, especially among minibond holders.

=== Hong Kong ===
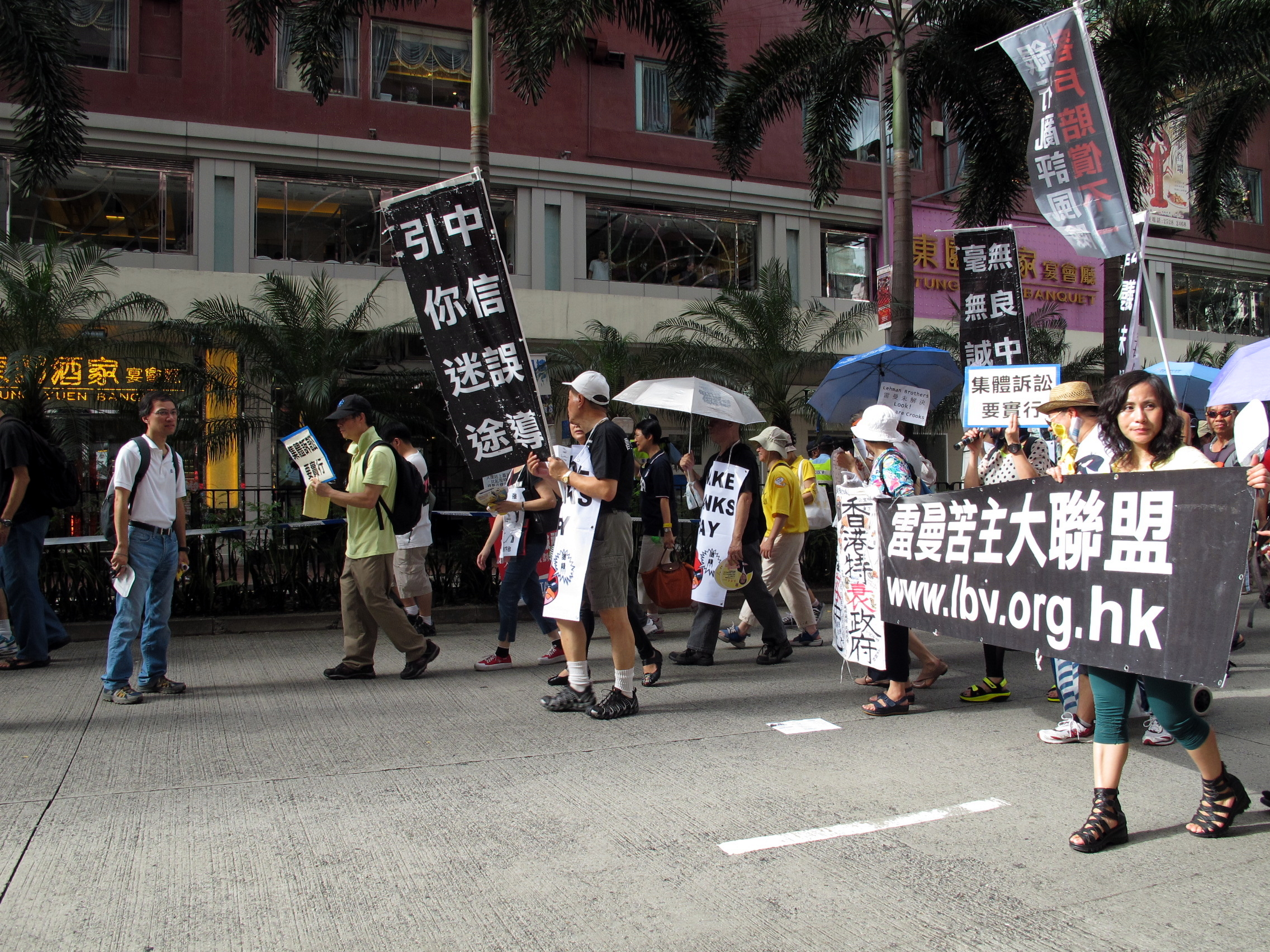
In 2012, Hong Kong Lehman victims participated in the 1 July Parade

At time Hong Kong had the with the largest issuance volume and widest coverage of minibonds. Most minibond investors regard them as a deposit replacement product with higher yields and could not accept the possibility that their principal may not be recovered. Since investors were in direct contact with retail banks and did not even notice their relationship with Lehman Brothers during the purchase process, their dissatisfaction with the banks increased sharply. The main complaint focused on the bank's unreasonable sales tactics.

=== Protests and demonstrations ===
On 22 October 2008, the Hong Kong Legislative Council passed a non-binding motion condemning the Hong Kong SAR government for its inadequate supervision in this incident. During the period, the pan-democrats urged the Legislative Council to use the privilege law to establish a committee to investigate the incident. As a result, the Democratic Alliance for the Betterment of Hong Kong and the Federation of Trade Unions unanimously voted against it. But the law was re-introduced and finally, the Legislative Council unanimously voted to establish a committee to investigate the incident.

=== Government response ===
Some members of the Legislative Council believed that the name "minibonds" was misleading. The Chief Executive Officer of the Securities and Futures Commission of Hong Kong, William Wei, responded that minibonds were "just a brand name" and they were debentures.

The Commission issued an investigation report in June 2012, which "condemned" the then CEO of the Hong Kong Monetary Authority, Mr Yam Chi-kong, and was "extremely disappointed" with the then Chairman of the Securities and Futures Commission, William Wei. The Committee Vice Chairman Huang Yihong and members Lin Jianfeng and Shi Liqian refused to sign the report because they did not agree with condemning Yam Zhigang, and they published a separate minority report.

== See also ==
- Credit
- Credit derivative risks
- Default Risk
- Credit-linked note
- Collateralized debt obligation
