= Derivative (finance) =

Type of financial contract

In finance, a derivative is a contract between a buyer and a seller. The derivative can take various forms, depending on the transaction, but every derivative has the following four elements:

1. an item (the "underlier") that can or must be bought or sold,
2. a future act which must occur (such as a sale or purchase of the underlier),
3. a price at which the future transaction must take place, and
4. a future date by which the act (such as a purchase or sale) must take place.

A derivative's value depends on the performance of the underlier, which can be a commodity (for example, corn or oil), a financial instrument (e.g. a stock or a bond), a price index, a currency, or an interest rate.

Derivatives can be used to insure against price movements (hedging), increase exposure to price movements for speculation, or get access to otherwise hard-to-trade assets or markets. Most derivatives are price guarantees. Some derivatives are based on the occurrence of specific events or measurable outcomes rather than directly on market prices. Agricultural and energy companies use derivatives to hedge risks such as weather conditions and commodity price fluctuations. Derivatives can be used to protect lenders against the risk of borrowers defaulting on an obligation.

Some of the more common derivatives include forwards, futures, options, swaps, and variations of these such as synthetic collateralized debt obligations and credit default swaps. Most derivatives are traded over-the-counter (off-exchange) or on an exchange such as the Chicago Mercantile Exchange, while most insurance contracts have developed into a separate industry. In the United States, after the 2008 financial crisis, there has been increased pressure to move derivatives to trade on exchanges.

Derivatives are one of the three main categories of financial instruments, the other two being equity (i.e., stocks or shares) and debt (i.e., bonds and mortgages). The oldest example of a derivative in history, attested to by Aristotle, is thought to be a contract transaction of olives, entered into by ancient Greek philosopher Thales, who made a profit in the exchange. However, Aristotle did not define this arrangement as a derivative but as a monopoly (Aristotle's Politics, Book I, Chapter XI). Bucket shops, outlawed in 1936 in the US, are a more recent historical example.

== Basics ==
Derivatives are contracts between two parties that specify conditions (especially the dates, resulting values and definitions of the underlying variables, the parties' contractual obligations, and the notional amount) under which payments are to be made between the parties. The assets include commodities, stocks, bonds, interest rates and currencies, but they can also be other derivatives, which adds another layer of complexity to proper valuation. The components of a firm's capital structure, e.g., bonds and stock, can also be considered derivatives, more precisely options, with the underlying being the firm's assets, but this is unusual outside of technical contexts.

From the economic point of view, financial derivatives are cash flows that are conditioned stochastically and discounted to present value. The market risk inherent in the underlying asset is attached to the financial derivative through contractual agreements and hence can be traded separately. The underlying asset does not have to be acquired. Derivatives therefore allow the breakup of ownership and participation in the market value of an asset. This also provides a considerable amount of freedom regarding the contract design. That contractual freedom allows derivative designers to modify the participation in the performance of the underlying asset almost arbitrarily. Thus, the participation in the market value of the underlying can be effectively weaker, stronger (leverage effect), or implemented as inverse. Hence, specifically the market price risk of the underlying asset can be controlled in almost every situation.

There are two groups of derivative contracts: the privately traded over-the-counter (OTC) derivatives such as swaps that do not go through an exchange or other intermediary, and exchange-traded derivatives (ETD) that are traded through specialized derivatives exchanges or other exchanges.

Derivatives are more common in the modern era, but their origins trace back several centuries. One of the oldest derivatives is rice futures, which have been traded on the Dojima Rice Exchange since the eighteenth century. Derivatives are broadly categorized by the relationship between the underlying asset and the derivative (such as forward, option, swap); the type of underlying asset (such as equity derivatives, foreign exchange derivatives, interest rate derivatives, commodity derivatives, or credit derivatives); the market in which they trade (such as exchange-traded or over-the-counter); and their pay-off profile.

Derivatives may broadly be categorized as "lock" or "option" products. Lock products (such as swaps, futures, or forwards) obligate the contractual parties to the terms over the life of the contract. Option products (such as interest rate swaps) provide the buyer the right, but not the obligation to enter the contract under the terms specified.

Derivatives can be used either for risk management (i.e. to "hedge" by providing offsetting compensation in case of an undesired event, a kind of "insurance") or for speculation (i.e. making a financial "bet"). This distinction is important because the former is a prudent aspect of operations and financial management for many firms across many industries; the latter offers managers and investors a risky opportunity to increase profit, which may not be properly disclosed to stakeholders.

Along with many other financial products and services, derivatives reform is an element of the Dodd–Frank Wall Street Reform and Consumer Protection Act of 2010. The Act delegated many rule-making details of regulatory oversight to the Commodity Futures Trading Commission (CFTC) and those details are not finalized nor fully implemented as of late 2012.

== Size of market ==
To give an idea of the size of the derivative market, The Economist has reported that as of June 2011, the over-the-counter (OTC) derivatives market amounted to approximately $700 trillion, and the size of the market traded on exchanges totaled an additional $83 trillion. For the fourth quarter 2017 the European Securities Market Authority estimated the size of European derivatives market at a size of €660 trillion with 74 million outstanding contracts.

However, these are "notional" values, and some economists say that these aggregated values greatly exaggerate the market value and the true credit risk faced by the parties involved. For example, in 2010, while the aggregate of OTC derivatives exceeded $600 trillion, the value of the market was estimated to be much lower, at $21 trillion. The credit-risk equivalent of the derivative contracts was estimated at $3.3 trillion.

Still, even these scaled-down figures represent huge amounts of money. For perspective, the budget for total expenditure of the United States government during 2012 was $3.5 trillion, and the total current value of the U.S. stock market is an estimated $23 trillion. Meanwhile, the global annual Gross Domestic Product is about $65 trillion.

At least for one type of derivative, credit default swaps (CDS), for which the inherent risk is considered high, the higher, nominal value remains relevant. It was this type of derivative that investment magnate Warren Buffett referred to in his famous 2002 speech in which he warned against "financial weapons of mass destruction". CDS notional value in early 2012 amounted to $25.5 trillion, down from $55 trillion in 2008.

== Usage ==
Derivatives are used for the following:

- Hedge or to mitigate risk in the underlying, by entering into a derivative contract whose value moves in the opposite direction to their underlying position and cancels part or all of it out
- Create option ability where the value of the derivative is linked to a specific condition or event (e.g., the underlying reaching a specific price level).
- Obtain exposure to the underlying where it is not possible to trade in the underlying (e.g., weather derivatives).
- Provide leverage (or gearing), such that a small movement in the underlying value can cause a large difference in the value of the derivative.
- Speculate and make a profit if the value of the underlying asset moves the way they expect (e.g. moves in a given direction, stays in or out of a specified range, reaches a certain level).
- Switch asset allocations between different asset classes without disturbing the underlying assets, as part of transition management
- Avoid paying taxes. For example, an equity swap allows an investor to receive steady payments, e.g. based on SONIA rate, while avoiding paying capital gains tax and keeping the stock.
- For arbitraging purposes, allowing a riskless profit by simultaneously entering into transactions into two or more markets.

=== Mechanics and valuation ===
Lock products are theoretically valued at zero at the time of execution and thus do not typically require an up-front exchange between the parties. Based upon movements in the underlying asset over time, however, the value of the contract will fluctuate, and the derivative may be either an asset (i.e., "in the money") or a liability (i.e., "out of the money") at different points throughout its life. Importantly, either party is therefore exposed to the credit quality of its counterparty and is interested in protecting itself in an event of default.

Option products have immediate value at the outset because they provide specified protection (intrinsic value) over a given time period (time value). One common form of option product familiar to many consumers is insurance for homes and automobiles. The insured would pay more for a policy with greater liability protections (intrinsic value) and one that extends for a year rather than six months (time value). Because of the immediate option value, the option purchaser typically pays an up front premium. Just like for lock products, movements in the underlying asset will cause the option's intrinsic value to change over time while its time value deteriorates steadily until the contract expires. An important difference between a lock product is that, after the initial exchange, the option purchaser has no further liability to its counterparty; upon maturity, the purchaser will execute the option if it has positive value (i.e., if it is "in the money") or expire at no cost (other than to the initial premium) (i.e., if the option is "out of the money").

=== Hedge ===
Derivatives allow risk related to the price of the underlying asset to be transferred from one party to another. For example, a wheat farmer and a miller could sign a futures contract to exchange a specified amount of cash for a specified amount of wheat in the future. Both parties have reduced a future risk: for the wheat farmer, the uncertainty of the price, and for the miller, the availability of wheat. However, there is still the risk that no wheat will be available because of events unspecified by the contract, such as the weather, or that one party will renege on the contract. Although a third party, called a clearing house, insures a futures contract, not all derivatives are insured against counter-party risk.

From another perspective, the farmer and the miller both reduce a risk and acquire a risk when they sign the futures contract: the farmer reduces the risk that the price of wheat will fall below the price specified in the contract and acquires the risk that the price of wheat will rise above the price specified in the contract (thereby losing additional income that he could have earned). The miller, on the other hand, acquires the risk that the price of wheat will fall below the price specified in the contract (thereby paying more in the future than he otherwise would have) and reduces the risk that the price of wheat will rise above the price specified in the contract. In this sense, one party is the insurer (risk taker) for one type of risk, and the counter-party is the insurer (risk taker) for another type of risk.

Hedging also occurs when an individual or institution buys an asset (such as a commodity, a bond that has coupon payments, a stock that pays dividends, and so on) and sells it using a futures contract. The individual or institution has access to the asset for a specified amount of time, and can then sell it in the future at a specified price according to the futures contract. Of course, this allows the individual or institution the benefit of holding the asset, while reducing the risk that the future selling price will deviate unexpectedly from the market's current assessment of the future value of the asset.

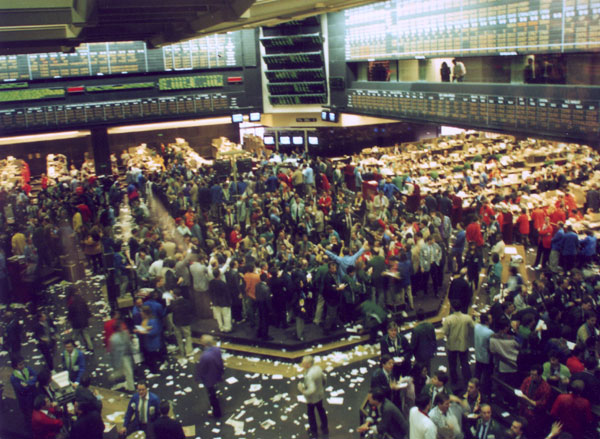
Derivatives traders in the pit at the Chicago Board of Trade in 1993

Derivatives trading of this kind may serve the financial interests of certain particular businesses. For example, a corporation borrows a large sum of money at a specific interest rate. The interest rate on the loan reprices every six months. The corporation is concerned that the rate of interest may be much higher in six months. The corporation could buy a forward rate agreement (FRA), which is a contract to pay a fixed rate of interest six months after purchases on a notional amount of money. If the interest rate after six months is above the contract rate, the seller will pay the difference to the corporation, or FRA buyer. If the rate is lower, the corporation will pay the difference to the seller. The purchase of the FRA serves to reduce the uncertainty concerning the rate increase and stabilize earnings.

=== Speculation ===
Derivatives can be used to acquire risk, rather than to hedge against risk. Thus, some individuals and institutions will enter into a derivative contract to speculate on the value of the underlying asset. Speculators look to buy an asset in the future at a low price according to a derivative contract when the future market price is high, or to sell an asset in the future at a high price according to a derivative contract when the future market price is less.

Speculative trading in derivatives gained a great deal of notoriety in 1995 when Nick Leeson, a trader at Barings Bank, made poor and unauthorized investments in futures contracts. Through a combination of poor judgment, lack of oversight by the bank's management and regulators, and unfortunate events like the Kobe earthquake, Leeson incurred a $1.3 billion loss that bankrupted the centuries-old institution.

=== Arbitrage ===
Individuals and institutions may also look for arbitrage opportunities, as when the current buying price of an asset falls below the price specified in a futures contract to sell the asset.

=== Proportion used for hedging and speculation ===
The true proportion of derivatives contracts used for hedging purposes is unknown, but it appears to be relatively small. Also, derivatives contracts account for only 3–6% of the median firms' total currency and interest rate exposure. Nonetheless, we know that many firms' derivatives activities have at least some speculative component for a variety of reasons.

== Types ==
In broad terms, there are two groups of derivative contracts, which are distinguished by the way they are traded in the market:

=== Over-the-counter derivatives ===
Over-the-counter (OTC) derivatives are contracts that are traded (and privately negotiated) directly between two parties, without going through an exchange or other intermediary. Products such as swaps, forward rate agreements, exotic options – and other exotic derivatives – are almost always traded in this way. The OTC derivative market is the largest market for derivatives, and is largely unregulated with respect to disclosure of information between the parties, since the OTC market is made up of banks and other highly sophisticated parties, such as hedge funds. Reporting of OTC amounts is difficult because trades can occur in private, without activity being visible on any exchanges.

According to the Bank for International Settlements, who first surveyed OTC derivatives in 1995, reported that the "gross market value, which represent the cost of replacing all open contracts at the prevailing market prices, ... increased by 74% since 2004, to $11 trillion at the end of June 2007 (BIS 2007:24)." Positions in the OTC derivatives market increased to $516 trillion at the end of June 2007, 135% higher than the level recorded in 2004. The total outstanding notional amount is US$708 trillion (as of June 2011). Of this total notional amount, 67% are interest rate contracts, 8% are credit default swaps (CDSs), 9% are foreign exchange contracts, 2% are commodity contracts, 1% are equity contracts, and 12% are other. Because OTC derivatives are not traded on an exchange, there is no central counter-party. Therefore, they are subject to counterparty risk, like an ordinary contract, since each counter-party relies on the other to perform.

=== Exchange-traded derivatives ===
Exchange-traded derivatives (ETD) are those derivatives instruments that are traded via specialized derivatives exchanges or other exchanges. A derivatives exchange is a market where individuals trade standardized contracts that have been defined by the exchange. A derivatives exchange acts as an intermediary to all related transactions, and takes initial margin from both sides of the trade to act as a guarantee. The world's largest derivatives exchanges (by number of transactions) are the Korea Exchange (which lists KOSPI Index Futures & Options), Eurex (which lists a wide range of European products such as interest rate & index products), and CME Group (made up of the 2007 merger of the Chicago Mercantile Exchange and the Chicago Board of Trade and the 2008 acquisition of the New York Mercantile Exchange). According to BIS, the combined turnover in the world's derivatives exchanges totaled US$344 trillion during Q4 2005. By December 2007 the Bank for International Settlements reported that "derivatives traded on exchanges surged 27% to a record $681 trillion."

=== Inverse ETFs and leveraged ETFs ===
Inverse exchange-traded funds (IETFs) and leveraged exchange-traded funds (LETFs) are two special types of exchange traded funds (ETFs) that are available to common traders and investors on major exchanges like the NYSE and Nasdaq. To maintain these products' net asset value, these funds' administrators must employ more sophisticated financial engineering methods than what's usually required for maintenance of traditional ETFs. These instruments must also be regularly rebalanced and re-indexed each day.

=== Common derivative contract ===
Some of the common variants of derivative contracts are as follows:

1. Forwards: tailored contract between two parties, where payment takes place at a specific time in the future at today's pre-determined price.
2. Futures: contracts to buy or sell an asset on a future date at a price specified today. A futures contract differs from a forward contract in that the futures contract is a standardized contract written by a clearing house that operates an exchange where the contract can be bought and sold; the forward contract is a non-standardized contract written by the parties themselves.
3. Options: contracts that give the owner the right, but not the obligation, to buy (in the case of a call option) or sell (in the case of a put option) an asset. The price at which the sale takes place is known as the strike price, and is specified at the time the parties enter into the option. The option contract also specifies a maturity date. In the case of a European option, the owner has the right to require the sale to take place on (but not before) the maturity date; in the case of an American option, the owner can require the sale to take place at any time up to the maturity date. If the owner of the contract exercises this right, the counter-party has the obligation to carry out the transaction. Options are of two types: call option and put option.
4. Binary options: contracts that provide the owner with an all-or-nothing profit profile.
5. Warrants: apart from the commonly used short-dated options which have a maximum maturity period of one year, there exist certain long-dated options as well, known as warrants. These are generally traded over the counter.
6. Swaps: contracts to exchange cash (flows) on or before a specified future date based on the underlying value of currencies exchange rates, bonds/interest rates, commodities exchange, stocks or other assets.

Swaps can basically be categorized into Interest rate swap and currency swap.

Some common examples of these derivatives are the following:

UNDERLYING	CONTRACT TYPES				
UNDERLYING	Exchange-traded futures	Exchange-traded options	OTC swap	OTC forward	OTC option
Equity	DJIA Index future Single-stock future	Option on DJIA Index future Single-share option	Equity swap	Back-to-back; Repurchase agreement	Stock option Warrant; Turbo warrant
Interest rate	Eurodollar future Euribor future	Option on Eurodollar future Option on Euribor future	Interest rate swap	Forward rate agreement	Interest rate cap and floor Swaption; Basis swap Bond option
Credit	Bond future	Option on Bond future	Credit default swap Total return swap	Repurchase agreement	Credit default option
Foreign exchange	Currency future	Option on currency future	Currency swap	Currency forward	Currency option
Commodity	WTI crude oil futures	Weather derivative	Commodity swap	Iron ore forward contract	Gold option

=== Collateralized debt obligation ===
A collateralized debt obligation (CDO) is a type of structured asset-backed security (ABS). An "asset-backed security" is used as an umbrella term for a type of security backed by a pool of assets – including collateralized debt obligations and mortgage-backed securities (MBS) (Example: "The capital market in which asset-backed securities are issued and traded is composed of three main categories: ABS, MBS and CDOs".) – and sometimes for a particular type of that security – one backed by consumer loans (example: "As a rule of thumb, securitization issues backed by mortgages are called MBS, and securitization issues backed by debt obligations are called CDO, [and] Securitization issues backed by consumer-backed products – car loans, consumer loans and credit cards, among others – are called ABS.) Originally developed for the corporate debt markets, over time CDOs evolved to encompass the mortgage and mortgage-backed security (MBS) markets.

Like other private-label securities backed by assets, a CDO can be thought of as a promise to pay investors in a prescribed sequence, based on the cash flow the CDO collects from the pool of bonds or other assets it owns. The CDO is "sliced" into "tranches", which "catch" the cash flow of interest and principal payments in sequence based on seniority. If some loans default and the cash collected by the CDO is insufficient to pay all of its investors, those in the lowest, most "junior" tranches suffer losses first. The last to lose payment from default are the safest, most senior tranches. Consequently, coupon payments (and interest rates) vary by tranche with the safest/most senior tranches paying the lowest and the lowest tranches paying the highest rates to compensate for higher default risk. As an example, a CDO might issue the following tranches in order of safeness: Senior AAA (sometimes known as "super senior"); Junior AAA; AA; A; BBB; Residual.

Separate special-purpose entities – rather than the parent investment bank – issue the CDOs and pay interest to investors. As CDOs developed, some sponsors repackaged tranches into yet another iteration called "CDO-Squared" or the "CDOs of CDOs". In the early 2000s, CDOs were generally diversified, but by 2006–2007 – when the CDO market grew to hundreds of billions of dollars – this changed. CDO collateral became dominated not by loans, but by lower level (BBB or A) tranches recycled from other asset-backed securities, whose assets were usually non-prime mortgages. These CDOs have been called "the engine that powered the mortgage supply chain" for nonprime mortgages, and are credited with giving lenders greater incentive to make non-prime loans leading up to the 2007–09 subprime mortgage crisis.

=== Credit default swap ===
A credit default swap (CDS) is a financial swap agreement that the seller of the CDS will compensate the buyer (the creditor of the reference loan) in the event of a loan default (by the debtor) or other credit event. The buyer of the CDS makes a series of payments (the CDS "fee" or "spread") to the seller and, in exchange, receives a payoff if the loan defaults. It was invented by Blythe Masters from JP Morgan in 1994. In the event of default the buyer of the CDS receives compensation (usually the face value of the loan), and the seller of the CDS takes possession of the defaulted loan. However, anyone with sufficient collateral to trade with a bank or hedge fund can purchase a CDS, even buyers who do not hold the loan instrument and who have no direct insurable interest in the loan (these are called "naked" CDSs). If there are more CDS contracts outstanding than bonds in existence, a protocol exists to hold a credit event auction; the payment received is usually substantially less than the face value of the loan. Credit default swaps have existed since the early 1990s, and increased in use after 2003. By the end of 2007, the outstanding CDS amount was $62.2 trillion, falling to $26.3 trillion by mid-year 2010 but reportedly $25.5 trillion in early 2012. CDSs are not traded on an exchange and there is no required reporting of transactions to a government agency. During the 2008 financial crisis, the lack of transparency in this large market became a concern to regulators as it could pose a systemic risk.

In March 2010, the [DTCC] Trade Information Warehouse announced it would give regulators greater access to its credit default swaps database. CDS data can be used by financial professionals, regulators, and the media to monitor how the market views credit risk of any entity on which a CDS is available, which can be compared to that provided by credit rating agencies. U.S. courts may soon be following suit. Most CDSs are documented using standard forms drafted by the International Swaps and Derivatives Association (ISDA), although there are many variants. In addition to the basic, single-name swaps, there are basket default swaps (BDSs), index CDSs, funded CDSs (also called credit-linked notes), as well as loan-only credit default swaps (LCDS). In addition to corporations and governments, the reference entity can include a special-purpose vehicle issuing asset-backed securities. Some claim that derivatives such as CDS are potentially dangerous in that they combine priority in bankruptcy with a lack of transparency. A CDS can be unsecured (without collateral) and be at higher risk for a default.

=== Forwards ===
In finance, a forward contract or simply a forward is a non-standardized contract between two parties to buy or to sell an asset at a specified future time at an amount agreed upon today, making it a type of derivative instrument. This is in contrast to a spot contract, which is an agreement to buy or sell an asset on its spot date, which may vary depending on the instrument, for example most of the FX contracts have Spot Date two business days from today. The party agreeing to buy the underlying asset in the future assumes a long position, and the party agreeing to sell the asset in the future assumes a short position. The price agreed upon is called the delivery price, which is equal to the forward price at the time the contract is entered into. The price of the underlying instrument, in whatever form, is paid before control of the instrument changes. This is one of the many forms of buy/sell orders where the time and date of trade is not the same as the value date where the securities themselves are exchanged.

The forward price of such a contract is commonly contrasted with the spot price, which is the price at which the asset changes hands on the spot date. The difference between the spot and the forward price is the forward premium or forward discount, generally considered in the form of a profit, or loss, by the purchasing party. Forwards, like other derivative securities, can be used to hedge risk (typically currency or exchange rate risk), as a means of speculation, or to allow a party to take advantage of a quality of the underlying instrument which is time-sensitive.

A closely related contract is a futures contract; they differ in certain respects. Forward contracts are very similar to futures contracts, except they are not exchange-traded, or defined on standardized assets. Forwards also typically have no interim partial settlements or "true-ups" in margin requirements like futures – such that the parties do not exchange additional property securing the party at gain and the entire unrealized gain or loss builds up while the contract is open. However, being traded over the counter (OTC), forward contracts specification can be customized and may include mark-to-market and daily margin calls. Hence, a forward contract arrangement might call for the loss party to pledge collateral or additional collateral to better secure the party at gain. In other words, the terms of the forward contract will determine the collateral calls based upon certain "trigger" events relevant to a particular counterparty such as among other things, credit ratings, value of assets under management or redemptions over a specific time frame (e.g., quarterly, annually).

=== Futures ===
In finance, a 'futures contract' (more colloquially, futures) is a standardized contract between two parties to buy or sell a specified asset of standardized quantity and quality for a price agreed upon today (the futures price) with delivery and payment occurring at a specified future date, the delivery date, making it a derivative product (i.e. a financial product that is derived from an underlying asset). The contracts are negotiated at a futures exchange, which acts as an intermediary between buyer and seller. The party agreeing to buy the underlying asset in the future, the "buyer" of the contract, is said to be "long", and the party agreeing to sell the asset in the future, the "seller" of the contract, is said to be "short".

While the futures contract specifies a trade taking place in the future, the purpose of the futures exchange is to act as intermediary and mitigate the risk of default by either party in the intervening period. For this reason, the futures exchange requires both parties to put up an initial amount of cash (performance bond), the margin. Margins, sometimes set as a percentage of the value of the futures contract, need to be proportionally maintained at all times during the life of the contract to underpin this mitigation because the price of the contract will vary in keeping with supply and demand and will change daily and thus one party or the other will theoretically be making or losing money. To mitigate risk and the possibility of default by either party, the product is marked to market on a daily basis whereby the difference between the prior agreed-upon price and the actual daily futures price is settled on a daily basis. This is sometimes known as the variation margin where the futures exchange will draw money out of the losing party's margin account and put it into the other party's thus ensuring that the correct daily loss or profit is reflected in the respective account. If the margin account goes below a certain value set by the Exchange, then a margin call is made and the account owner must replenish the margin account. This process is known as "marking to market". Thus on the delivery date, the amount exchanged is not the specified price on the contract but the spot value (i.e., the original value agreed upon, since any gain or loss has already been previously settled by marking to market). Upon marketing the strike price is often reached and creates much income for the "caller".

A closely related contract is a forward contract. A forward is like a futures in that it specifies the exchange of goods for a specified price at a specified future date. However, a forward is not traded on an exchange and thus does not have the interim partial payments due to marking to market. Nor is the contract standardized, as on the exchange. Unlike an option, both parties of a futures contract must fulfill the contract on the delivery date. The seller delivers the underlying asset to the buyer, or, if it is a cash-settled futures contract, then cash is transferred from the futures trader who sustained a loss to the one who made a profit. To exit the commitment prior to the settlement date, the holder of a futures position can close out its contract obligations by taking the opposite position on another futures contract on the same asset and settlement date. The difference in futures prices is then a profit or loss.

=== Mortgage-backed securities ===
A mortgage-backed security (MBS) is an asset-backed security that is secured by a mortgage, or more commonly a collection ("pool") of sometimes hundreds of mortgages. The mortgages are sold to a group of individuals (a government agency or investment bank) that "securitizes", or packages, the loans together into a security that can be sold to investors. The mortgages of an MBS may be residential or commercial, depending on whether it is an Agency MBS or a Non-Agency MBS; in the United States they may be issued by structures set up by government-sponsored enterprises like Fannie Mae or Freddie Mac, or they can be "private-label", issued by structures set up by investment banks. The structure of the MBS may be known as "pass-through", where the interest and principal payments from the borrower or homebuyer pass through it to the MBS holder, or it may be more complex, made up of a pool of other MBSs. Other types of MBS include collateralized mortgage obligations (CMOs, often structured as real estate mortgage investment conduits) and collateralized debt obligations (CDOs).

The shares of subprime MBSs issued by various structures, such as CMOs, are not identical but rather issued as tranches (French for "slices"), each with a different level of priority in the debt repayment stream, giving them different levels of risk and reward. Tranches – especially the lower-priority, higher-interest tranches – of an MBS are/were often further repackaged and resold as collaterized debt obligations. These subprime MBSs issued by investment banks were a major issue in the subprime mortgage crisis of 2006–2008 . The total face value of an MBS decreases over time, because like mortgages, and unlike bonds, and most other fixed-income securities, the principal in an MBS is not paid back as a single payment to the bond holder at maturity but rather is paid along with the interest in each periodic payment (monthly, quarterly, etc.). This decrease in face value is measured by the MBS's "factor", the percentage of the original "face" that remains to be repaid.

=== Options ===
In finance, an option is a contract which gives the buyer (the owner) the right, but not the obligation, to buy or sell an underlying asset or instrument at a specified strike price on or before a specified date. The seller has the corresponding obligation to fulfill the transaction – that is to sell or buy – if the buyer (owner) "exercises" the option. The buyer pays a premium to the seller for this right. An option that conveys to the owner the right to buy something at a certain price is a "call option"; an option that conveys the right of the owner to sell something at a certain price is a "put option". Both are commonly traded, but for clarity, the call option is more frequently discussed. Options valuation is a topic of ongoing research in academic and practical finance. In basic terms, the value of an option is commonly decomposed into two parts:

- The first part is the "intrinsic value", defined as the difference between the market value of the underlying and the strike price of the given option.
- The second part is the "time value", which depends on a set of other factors which, through a multivariable, non-linear interrelationship, reflect the discounted expected value of that difference at expiration.

Although options valuation has been studied since the 19th century, the contemporary approach is based on the Black–Scholes model, which was first published in 1973.

Options contracts have been known for many centuries. However, both trading activity and academic interest increased when, as from 1973, options were issued with standardized terms and traded through a guaranteed clearing house at the Chicago Board Options Exchange. Today, many options are created in a standardized form and traded through clearing houses on regulated options exchanges, while other over-the-counter options are written as bilateral, customized contracts between a single buyer and seller, one or both of which may be a dealer or market-maker. Options are part of a larger class of financial instruments known as derivative products or simply derivatives.

=== Swaps ===
A swap is a derivative in which two counterparties exchange cash flows of one party's financial instrument for those of the other party's financial instrument. The benefits in question depend on the type of financial instruments involved. For example, in the case of a swap involving two bonds, the benefits in question can be the periodic interest (coupon) payments associated with such bonds. Specifically, two counterparties agree to the exchange one stream of cash flows against another stream. These streams are called the swap's "legs". The swap agreement defines the dates when the cash flows are to be paid and the way they are accrued and calculated. Usually at the time when the contract is initiated, at least one of these series of cash flows is determined by an uncertain variable such as a floating interest rate, foreign exchange rate, equity price, or commodity price.

The cash flows are calculated over a notional principal amount. Contrary to a future, a forward or an option, the notional amount is usually not exchanged between counterparties. Consequently, swaps can be in cash or collateral. Swaps can be used to hedge certain risks such as interest rate risk, or to speculate on changes in the expected direction of underlying prices.

Swaps were first introduced to the public in 1981 when IBM and the World Bank entered into a swap agreement. Today, swaps are among the most heavily traded financial contracts in the world: the total amount of interest rates and currency swaps outstanding is more than $348 trillion in 2010, according to the Bank for International Settlements (BIS). The five generic types of swaps, in order of their quantitative importance, are: interest rate swaps, currency swaps, credit swaps, commodity swaps and equity swaps (there are many other types).

== Economic function of the derivative market ==
Some of the salient economic functions of the derivative market include:

1. Prices in a structured derivative market not only replicate the discernment of the market participants about the future but also lead the prices of underlying to the professed future level. On the expiration of the derivative contract, the prices of derivatives congregate with the prices of the underlying. Therefore, derivatives are essential tools to determine both current and future prices.
2. The derivatives market reallocates risk from the people who prefer risk aversion to the people who have an appetite for risk.
3. The intrinsic nature of derivatives market associates them to the underlying spot market. Due to derivatives there is a considerable increase in trade volumes of the underlying spot market. The dominant factor behind such an escalation is increased participation by additional players who would not have otherwise participated due to absence of any procedure to transfer risk.
4. As supervision, reconnaissance of the activities of various participants becomes tremendously difficult in assorted markets; the establishment of an organized form of market becomes all the more imperative. Therefore, in the presence of an organized derivatives market, speculation can be controlled, resulting in a more meticulous environment.
5. Third parties can use publicly available derivative prices as educated predictions of uncertain future outcomes, for example, the likelihood that a corporation will default on its debts.

In a nutshell, there is a substantial increase in savings and investment in the long run due to augmented activities by derivative market participant.

== Valuation ==
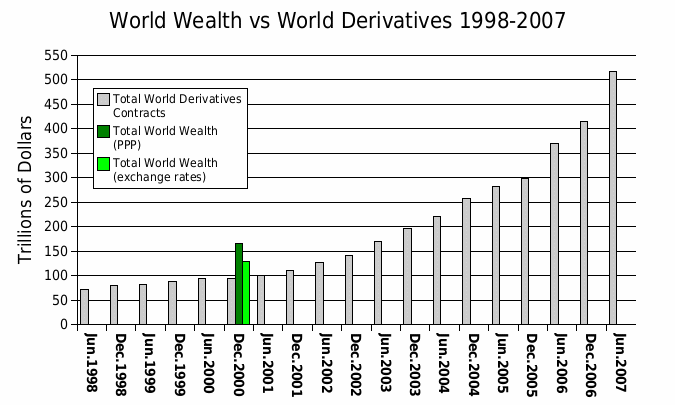
Total world derivatives from 1998 to 2007 compared to total world wealth in the year 2000

=== Market and arbitrage-free prices ===
Two common measures of value are:

- Market price, i.e. the price at which traders are willing to buy or sell the contract
- Arbitrage-free price, meaning that no risk-free profits can be made by trading in these contracts (see rational pricing)

=== Determining the market price ===
For exchange-traded derivatives, market price is usually transparent (often published in real time by the exchange, based on all the current bids and offers placed on that particular contract at any one time). Complications can arise with OTC or floor-traded contracts though, as trading is handled manually, making it difficult to automatically broadcast prices. In particular with OTC contracts, there is no central exchange to collate and disseminate prices.

=== Determining the arbitrage-free price ===
As outlined, a derivative is an instrument which allows, ultimately, for buying and selling of the "same" asset on two markets – the spot market and the derivatives market. Since there is "no such thing as a free lunch", the law of one price will apply here. (See replicating portfolio re the equivalence between these markets, and Rational pricing § Arbitrage mechanics for the enforcement of this law.) Thus, in a correctly priced derivative contract, the derivative price, its strike price / reference rate, and the spot price must be related such that no arbitrage is possible. Determining this, however, can be complex - with many different variables to consider - and derivative pricing is therefore central to financial mathematics.

For futures/forwards the arbitrage free price is relatively straightforward, involving the price of the underlying together with the cost of carry (income received less interest costs), although there can be complexities. Essentially, the forward price must be the same as the cost, including interest, of buying and storing the asset.

For swaps, since the instrument consists of two legs, to be arbitrage free, the terms of a swap contract are such that, initially, the net present value over both legs is equal. Each swap-leg can also be "decomposed" into a series of other instruments, placing arbitrage bounds on its traded value. These arguments extend to fixed-income securities more generally, in fact requiring arbitrage-consistency over all points on the yield curve.

For options, and more complex derivatives, pricing involves developing a sophisticated pricing model: understanding the stochastic process of the price of the underlying asset is often crucial. A key result for the theoretical valuation of options is the Black–Scholes formula, which is based on the assumption that the cash flows from a European stock option can be replicated by a continuous buying and selling strategy using only the stock. A simplified version of this valuation technique results in the binomial options model.

OTC represents the biggest challenge in arbitrage pricing. Since these contracts are not publicly traded, no market price is available to validate the theoretical valuation, and, in fact, a replication strategy may not be possible. Therefore, it is common that OTC derivatives are priced by Independent Agents that both counterparties involved in the deal designate upfront. These observations and concerns apply also to real options and employee stock options.

== Risks ==
Derivatives are often subject to the following criticisms; particularly since the 2008 financial crisis, the discipline of Risk management has developed attempting to address the below and other risks – see Financial risk management § Investment banking.

=== Hidden tail risk ===
According to Raghuram Rajan, a former chief economist of the International Monetary Fund (IMF), "... it may well be that the managers of these firms [investment funds] have figured out the correlations between the various instruments they hold and believe they are hedged. Yet as Chan and others (2005) point out, the lessons of summer 1998 following the default on Russian government debt is that correlations that are zero or negative in normal times can turn overnight to one – a phenomenon they term "phase lock-in". A hedged position "can become unhedged at the worst times, inflicting substantial losses on those who mistakenly believe they are protected". See the FRTB framework, which seeks to address this to some extent.

=== Leverage ===
The use of derivatives can result in large losses because of the use of leverage, or borrowing. Derivatives allow investors to earn large returns from small movements in the underlying asset's price. However, investors could lose large amounts if the price of the underlying moves against them significantly. There have been several instances of massive losses in derivative markets, such as the following:

- American International Group (AIG) lost more than US$18 billion through a subsidiary over the preceding three quarters on credit default swaps (CDSs). The United States Federal Reserve Bank announced the creation of a secured credit facility of up to US$85 billion, to prevent the company's collapse by enabling AIG to meet its obligations to deliver additional collateral to its credit default swap trading partners.
- The loss of US$7.2 Billion by Société Générale in January 2008 through mis-use of futures contracts.
- The loss of US$6.4 billion in the failed fund Amaranth Advisors, which was long natural gas in September 2006 when the price plummeted.
- The loss of US$4.6 billion in the failed fund Long-Term Capital Management in 1998.
- The loss of US$1.3 billion equivalent in oil derivatives in 1993 and 1994 by Metallgesellschaft AG.
- The loss of US$1.2 billion equivalent in equity derivatives in 1995 by Barings Bank.
- UBS AG, Switzerland's biggest bank, suffered a $2 billion loss through unauthorized trading discovered in September 2011.

Derivatives typically have a large notional value. As such, there is the danger that their use could result in losses for which the investor would be unable to compensate. The possibility that this could lead to a chain reaction ensuing in an economic crisis was pointed out by famed investor Warren Buffett in Berkshire Hathaway's 2002 annual report. Buffett called them 'financial weapons of mass destruction.' A potential problem with derivatives is that they comprise an increasingly larger notional amount of assets which may lead to distortions in the underlying capital and equities markets themselves. Investors begin to look at the derivatives markets to make a decision to buy or sell securities and so what was originally meant to be a market to transfer risk now becomes a leading indicator.(See Berkshire Hathaway Annual Report for 2002)

=== Counterparty risk ===
Some derivatives (especially swaps) expose investors to counterparty risk, or risk arising from the other party in a financial transaction. Counterparty risk results from the differences in the current price versus the expected future settlement price. Different types of derivatives have different levels of counter party risk. For example, standardized stock options by law require the party at risk to have a certain amount deposited with the exchange, showing that they can pay for any losses; banks that help businesses swap variable for fixed rates on loans may do credit checks on both parties. However, in private agreements between two companies, for example, there may not be benchmarks for performing due diligence and risk analysis.

== Financial reform and government regulation ==
Under US law and the laws of most other developed countries, derivatives have special legal exemptions that make them a particularly attractive legal form to extend credit. The strong creditor protections afforded to derivatives counterparties, in combination with their complexity and lack of transparency however, can cause capital markets to underprice credit risk. This can contribute to credit booms, and increase systemic risks. Indeed, the use of derivatives to conceal credit risk from third parties while protecting derivative counterparties contributed to the 2008 financial crisis in the United States.

The limited oversight in the derivatives market leading up to the 2008 financial crisis was not accidental, it was codified law. The Commodity Futures Modernization Act of 2000 (CFMA) explicitly excluded over-the-counter derivatives and swap markets from regulation by the Commodity Futures Trading Commission (CFTC). Prior to this act, swap markets and OTC derivatives operated in a legal gray space, but the CFMA solidified their exemption from regulation into law. The CFMA effectively gave swap markets the ability to operate independently of mandatory reporting, clearing, or capital requirements. The obscurity of the markets allowed Wall Street banking giants to accumulate enormous derivative positions without providing visibility to regulators or clients. As Wall Street bolstered their exposure to the swap market, a structural vulnerability in the banking system grew in tandem.

The newfound vulnerability that continued to compound in the banking system exploded in 2008, and the Financial Crisis Inquiry Commission (FCIC) was charged with identifying the root cause. They found that the OTC derivatives market contributed to the crisis in three main ways: the credit default swap (CDSs) market allowed investors to offset their risk into increasingly risky mortgage-backed securities, which in turn incentivized the speed at which securitization of financial products took place; CDS became an essential part of the creation of synthetic collateralized debt obligations (CDOs), which gave multiple investors exposure to the same underlying asset; and the sheer volume of the market made it systematically integral to the entire financial system. The synthetic CDO market at its height was estimated to be multiple times larger than the actual United States Mortgage market.

After the events of the financial crisis had unfolded, the opacity and scale of the derivatives market drew intense scrutiny. The Dodd-Frank Wall Street Reform and Consumer Protection Act of 2010 was the primary response to the findings of investigators. The provisions of the act mandated central clearing for most standardized swaps, required that trade reporting be registered to data repositories, and forced all major swap dealers to register with the SEC and CFTC.

Scholarly criticism of the act was rampant, positioning the act as a partial reversal of the failures of the CFMA, which led still to significant areas of the swap markets staying unregulated. Cornell legal scholar P.M Vasudev argued moving the concentration of the risk in clearinghouses did not eliminate the problem, it just transferred it to a separate, now systemically important nodes of the economy. As of June 2025, the OTC derivatives market notional value is estimated at $846 trillion. A 16% year-over-year gain in market size brought the gross market value to $21.8 trillion. The act clearly did not shrink the size of the market, as it is now larger than it was before the 2008 financial crisis, which seems to affirm the qualms of Vasudev and Stout.

In the context of a 2010 examination of the ICE Trust, an industry self-regulatory body, Gary Gensler, the chairman of the Commodity Futures Trading Commission which regulates most derivatives, was quoted saying that the derivatives marketplace as it functions now "adds up to higher costs to all Americans". More oversight of the banks in this market is needed, he also said. Additionally, the report said, "[t]he Department of Justice is looking into derivatives, too. The department's antitrust unit is actively investigating 'the possibility of anticompetitive practices in the credit derivatives clearing, trading and information services industries', according to a department spokeswoman."

For legislators and committees responsible for financial reform related to derivatives in the United States and elsewhere, distinguishing between hedging and speculative derivatives activities has been a nontrivial challenge. The distinction is critical because regulation should help to isolate and curtail speculation with derivatives, especially for "systemically significant" institutions whose default could be large enough to threaten the entire financial system. At the same time, the legislation should allow for responsible parties to hedge risk without unduly tying up working capital as collateral that firms may better employ elsewhere in their operations and investment. In this regard, it is important to distinguish between financial (e.g. banks) and non-financial end-users of derivatives (e.g. real estate development companies) because these firms' derivatives usage is inherently different. More importantly, the reasonable collateral that secures these different counterparties can be very different. The distinction between these firms is not always straight forward (e.g., hedge funds or even some private equity firms do not neatly fit either category). Finally, even financial users must be differentiated, as 'large' banks may classified as "systemically significant" whose derivatives activities must be more tightly monitored and restricted than those of smaller, local and regional banks.

Over-the-counter dealing will be less common as the Dodd–Frank Wall Street Reform and Consumer Protection Act comes into effect. The law mandated the clearing of certain swaps at registered exchanges and imposed various restrictions on derivatives. To implement Dodd-Frank, the CFTC developed new rules in at least 30 areas. The Commission determines which swaps are subject to mandatory clearing and whether a derivatives exchange is eligible to clear a certain type of swap contract.

Nonetheless, the above and other challenges of the rule-making process have delayed full enactment of aspects of the legislation relating to derivatives. The challenges are further complicated by the necessity to orchestrate globalized financial reform among the nations that comprise the world's major financial markets, a primary responsibility of the Financial Stability Board whose progress is ongoing.

In the U.S., by February 2012 the combined effort of the SEC and CFTC had produced over 70 proposed and final derivatives rules. However, both of them had delayed adoption of a number of derivatives regulations because of the burden of other rule-making, litigation and opposition to the rules, and many core definitions (such as the terms "swap", "security-based swap", "swap dealer", "security-based swap dealer", "major swap participant" and "major security-based swap participant") had still not been adopted. SEC Chairman Mary Schapiro opined: "At the end of the day, it probably does not make sense to harmonize everything [between the SEC and CFTC rules] because some of these products are quite different and certainly the market structures are quite different." On February 11, 2015, the Securities and Exchange Commission (SEC) released two final rules toward establishing a reporting and public disclosure framework for security-based swap transaction data. The two rules are not completely harmonized with the requirements with CFTC requirements.

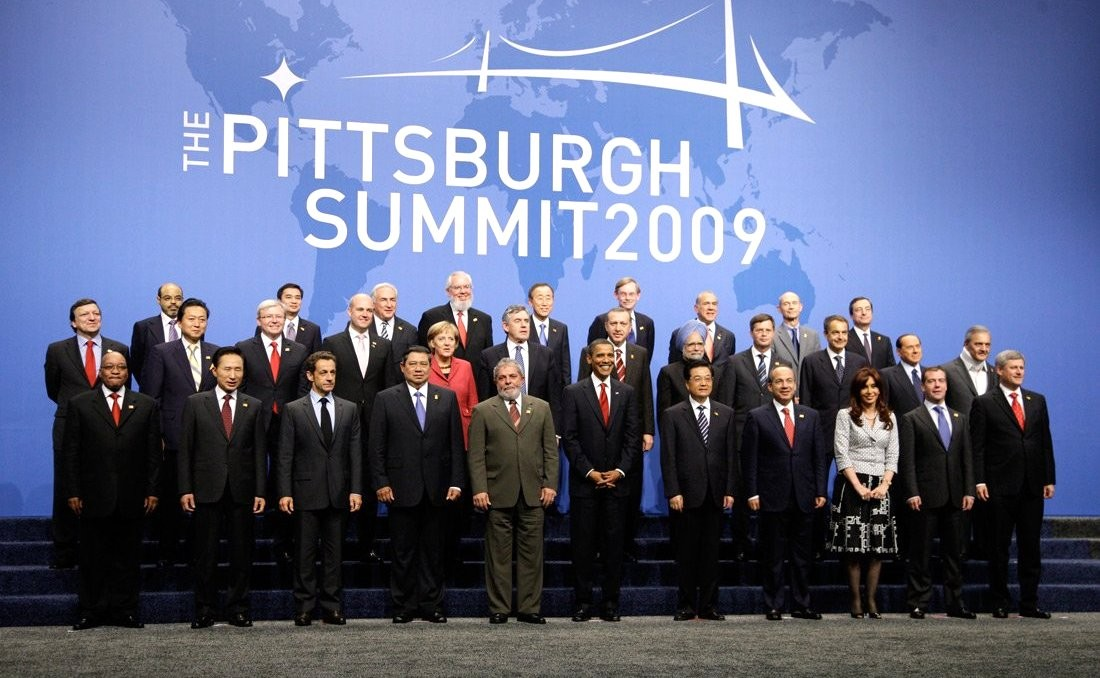
Country leaders at the 2009 G-20 Pittsburgh summit

In November 2012, the SEC and regulators from Australia, Brazil, the European Union, Hong Kong, Japan, Ontario, Quebec, Singapore, and Switzerland met to discuss reforming the OTC derivatives market, as had been agreed by leaders at the 2009 G-20 Pittsburgh summit in September 2009. In December 2012, they released a joint statement to the effect that they recognized that the market is a global one and "firmly support the adoption and enforcement of robust and consistent standards in and across jurisdictions", with the goals of mitigating risk, improving transparency, protecting against market abuse, preventing regulatory gaps, reducing the potential for arbitrage opportunities, and fostering a level playing field for market participants. They also agreed on the need to reduce regulatory uncertainty and provide market participants with sufficient clarity on laws and regulations by avoiding, to the extent possible, the application of conflicting rules to the same entities and transactions, and minimizing the application of inconsistent and duplicative rules. At the same time, they noted that "complete harmonization – perfect alignment of rules across jurisdictions" would be difficult, because of jurisdictions' differences in law, policy, markets, implementation timing, and legislative and regulatory processes.

On December 20, 2013, the CFTC provided information on its swaps regulation "comparability" determinations. The release addressed the CFTC's cross-border compliance exceptions. Specifically it addressed which entity level and in some cases transaction-level requirements in six jurisdictions (Australia, Canada, the European Union, Hong Kong, Japan, and Switzerland) it found comparable to its own rules, thus permitting non-US swap dealers, major swap participants, and the foreign branches of US Swap Dealers and major swap participants in these jurisdictions to comply with local rules in lieu of Commission rules.

=== Reporting ===
Mandatory reporting regulations are being finalized in a number of countries, such as Dodd Frank Act in the US, the European Market Infrastructure Regulations (EMIR) in Europe, as well as regulations in Hong Kong, Japan, Singapore, Canada, and other countries. The OTC Derivatives Regulators Forum (ODRF), a group of over 40 worldwide regulators, provided trade repositories with a set of guidelines regarding data access to regulators, and the Financial Stability Board and CPSS IOSCO also made recommendations in with regard to reporting.

DTCC, through its "Global Trade Repository" (GTR) service, manages global trade repositories for interest rates, and commodities, foreign exchange, credit, and equity derivatives. It makes global trade reports to the CFTC in the U.S., and plans to do the same for ESMA in Europe and for regulators in Hong Kong, Japan, and Singapore. It covers cleared and uncleared OTC derivatives products, whether or not a trade is electronically processed or bespoke.

== Glossary ==
- Bilateral netting: A legally enforceable arrangement between a bank and a counter-party that creates a single legal obligation covering all included individual contracts. This means that a bank's obligation, in the event of the default or insolvency of one of the parties, would be the net sum of all positive and negative fair values of contracts included in the bilateral netting arrangement.
- Counterparty: The legal and financial term for the other party in a financial transaction.
- Credit derivative: A contract that transfers credit risk from a protection buyer to a credit protection seller. Credit derivative products can take many forms, such as credit default swaps, credit linked notes and total return swaps.
- Derivative: A financial contract whose value is derived from the performance of assets, interest rates, currency exchange rates, or indexes. Derivative transactions include a wide assortment of financial contracts including structured debt obligations and deposits, swaps, futures, options, caps, floors, collars, forwards and various combinations thereof.
- Exchange-traded derivative contracts: Standardized derivative contracts (e.g., futures contracts and options) that are transacted on an organized futures exchange.
- Gross negative fair value: The sum of the fair values of contracts where the bank owes money to its counter-parties, without taking into account netting. This represents the maximum losses the bank's counter-parties would incur if the bank defaults and there is no netting of contracts, and no bank collateral was held by the counter-parties.
- Gross positive fair value: The sum total of the fair values of contracts where the bank is owed money by its counter-parties, without taking into account netting. This represents the maximum losses a bank could incur if all its counter-parties default and there is no netting of contracts, and the bank holds no counter-party collateral.
- High-risk mortgage securities: Securities where the price or expected average life is highly sensitive to interest rate changes, as determined by the U.S. Federal Financial Institutions Examination Council policy statement on high-risk mortgage securities.
- Notional amount: The nominal or face amount that is used to calculate payments made on swaps and other risk management products. This amount generally does not change hands and is thus referred to as notional.
- Over-the-counter (OTC) derivative contracts: Privately negotiated derivative contracts that are transacted off organized futures exchanges.
- Structured notes: Non-mortgage-backed debt securities, whose cash flow characteristics depend on one or more indices and / or have embedded forwards or options.
- Total risk-based capital: The sum of tier 1 plus tier 2 capital. Tier 1 capital consists of common shareholders equity, perpetual preferred shareholders equity with noncumulative dividends, retained earnings, and minority interests in the equity accounts of consolidated subsidiaries. Tier 2 capital consists of subordinated debt, intermediate-term preferred stock, cumulative and long-term preferred stock, and a portion of a bank's allowance for loan and lease losses.

== See also ==
- Credit derivative
- Derivatives law
- Equity derivative
- Exotic derivative
- Financial engineering
- Foreign exchange derivative
- Freight derivative
- Inflation derivative
- Interest rate derivative
- Property derivatives
- Weather derivative
