= Structured note =

Type of derivative in finance

A structured note is a debt security issued by a financial institution, usually a bank, whose return depends on the performance of something else, such as a stock index, a commodity, an interest rate or a currency. It usually combines a bond with a derivative, often an option. The derivative changes the note's risk and return compared with an ordinary bond.

An investor lends money to the issuer for a fixed term. At the end of the term, the issuer pays an amount set by the note's terms. Some notes protect all or part of the original sum if the underlying asset falls. Others do not. A structured note is a debt of the issuer, so the investor can lose money if the issuer defaults.

== Structure ==
The structured note is an over the counter derivative with hybrid security features which combine payoffs from multiple ordinary securities, typically a stock or bond plus a derivative. When the product depends on a credit payoff, it is called a credit-linked note. Since no such security exists outside of the sponsor creating this hybrid, the creditworthiness of this structured note depends on the strength of the sponsor.

== Examples ==
Two typical uses:

- A simple example of a structured note would be a five-year bond tied together with an option contract. The addition of the option contract changes the security's risk/return profile to make it more tailored to an investor's comfort zone. This makes it possible to invest in an asset class that would otherwise be considered too risky.
- From the investor's point of view, a structured note might look like this: I agree to a three-year contract with a bank. I give the bank $100. The money will be indexed to the S&P 500. In three years, if the S&P has gone up, the bank will pay me $100 plus the gain in the S&P. However, if the S&P has gone down, the bank will pay me back the entire $100 – an advantage known as downside protection. (In reality the downside protection is usually "contingent", i.e. it only applies up to a certain threshold amount. For example, with a threshold of 40%, if the S&P has gone down by more than 40%, the bank will no longer pay me back $100, but instead it will pay me the proportional value indexed to the S&P – e.g. $55 if the S&P has gone down by 45%.)

== Types ==
Structured notes are grouped by how the payment at maturity depends on the underlying asset. The main types are below. Issuers often combine features, so a single note can belong to more than one group.

=== Principal-protected notes ===
A principal-protected note promises to return the investor's original amount at maturity. The investor also receives a share of any rise in an index or basket of assets. It is usually built from a zero-coupon bond and a call option. The promise depends on the issuer staying solvent. When Lehman Brothers failed in 2008, holders of its principal-protected notes were treated as unsecured creditors.

=== Reverse convertibles ===
A reverse convertible pays a higher coupon than a normal bond of the same length, usually linked to a company's shares. In return, the investor takes on the risk of loss. If the share price falls below a set level, the investor may receive shares, or a cash amount based on their lower value, instead of the full original amount. In effect, the investor buys a high-yield bond from the issuer and sells the issuer a put option on the shares.

=== Autocallable notes ===
An autocallable note ends early if the underlying asset reaches a set level on an observation date. The issuer then pays the original amount plus any coupon owed. If that level is never reached, the note runs to maturity. Most autocallables are not principal-protected, though some include a "buffer" that covers losses up to a stated percentage.

=== Buffered and capped notes ===
A buffered note protects the investor against a fall in the underlying asset up to a set percentage, such as the first 10%. Losses beyond the buffer are passed on to the investor. A cap limits the gain the investor can receive.

=== Credit-linked notes ===
A credit-linked note combines a bond with a credit derivative. Its payments depend on whether a named borrower, the "reference entity", suffers a credit event, such as failing to pay its debts. The investor receives a higher coupon in return for taking that credit risk.

== See also ==
- Structured product – Pre-packaged investment strategy
- Credit-linked note – Form of funded credit derivative
- Equity-linked note – Financial instrument
- Floating rate note – Bonds that have a variable coupon
- Inverse floating rate note – Type of debt instrument
- Market-linked note – Pre-packaged investment strategy
