= Partial return reverse swap =

Type of derivative swap

Diagram explaining Total return swap

In finance, partial return reverse swap (PRRS) is a type of derivative swap, a financial contract that transfers a percentage of both the credit risk and market risk of an underlying asset, usually half, while also transferring all of the ownership liabilities for estate planning, tax purposes, and insider trading rules.

== Contract definition ==
A swap agreement in which one party makes payments based on a set rate, either fixed or variable, while the other party makes payments based on the return of an underlying asset, which includes both the income it generates and any capital gains. In partial return reverse swaps, the underlying asset, referred to as the reference asset, is usually a stock or portfolio of stocks. The reference asset is sold to the buyer, with half (or some other percentage) of the return owned by the party receiving the agreed rate of payment, which is usually in the form of a note payable.

Partial return reverse swaps allow the selling party to gain liquidity often through the use of algorithmic trading platforms that use technologies such as Stealth Technology and volume-seeking algorithms to more efficiently manage large blocks of stock while avoiding the risks of inside information. Sellers gain liquidity and buffering against any complications with inside information. Buyers effectively are able to purchase stock at a discount to market, for a private-to-public equities arbitrage opportunity. These swaps are considered to be exotic, but are growing in popularity. Investors like swaps like this because they get the benefit of a large exposure with a minimal or no cash outlay.

== Advantage ==
The PRRS allows one party (party A) to derive the economic benefit of owning an asset without having to keep that asset on its balance sheet, and allows the other (party B, which does transfer that asset to its balance sheet) to buy protection against loss in its value.

TRORS can be categorised as a type of credit derivative, although the product combines both market risk and credit risk, and so is not a pure credit derivative.

== Users ==
Hedge funds are using Partial Return Reverse Swaps to obtain leverage on the Reference Assets: they can receive the return of the asset, typically from an issuer or insider (which has a funding cost advantage), without having to put out the cash to buy the Asset. They usually post a smaller amount of collateral upfront, thus obtaining leverage. The term "Partial Return Reverse Swap" was first used in London by Taylor Moffitt of Holydean and later in his doctoral student writings. It was first practiced by fund management companies such as Greenridge Capital, as en effort to streamline a cluster of separate transactions often used together into one derivative swap agreement. These came out of small hedge funds and private investors doing private-to-public equities arbitrage.

== See also ==
- Total return swap
