= Derivatives law =

Derivatives law is the area of law governing derivatives. This includes regulations of commodities, as well as "the rich variety of futures contracts, options, and other financial instruments that can be traded today. In addition to tangible assets like grain, gold, and oil, trading occurs in economic measurements of stock market performance, weather patterns, inflation rates, air quality, housing prices, natural catastrophes, and discrete events."

It is associated with principles of contract law, and practitioners must also have a good understanding of insolvency, netting and set-off, and conflict of laws.

Over-the-counter derivatives are documented under master agreements, the most common of which is the International Swaps and Derivatives Association (ISDA) Master Agreement.

== See also ==
- Securities law
