= Floating rate =

Floating rate may refer to:

- Floating interest rate
- Floating rate note
- Floating exchange rate
