= Exchange-traded derivative contract =

Exchange-traded derivative contracts are standardized derivative contracts such as futures and options contracts that are transacted on an organized futures exchange. They are standardized and require payment of an initial deposit or margin settled through a clearing house. Since the contracts are standardized, accurate pricing models are often available. To understand which derivative is being traded, a standardised naming convention has been developed by the exchanges, that shows the expiry month and strike price using special letter codes.
