= Accumulator (structured product) =

Financial derivative product

Accumulators (a.k.a. share forward accumulators) are financial structured products sold by an issuer (seller) to investors (the buyer) that require the buyers to buy shares of some underlying security at a predetermined strike price, settled periodically. This allows the investor to "accumulate" holdings in the underlying security over the term of the contract; this then constitutes a structured product.

Sometimes known as "I kill you later" contracts, accumulators typically last for a year or less and terminate early ("knock-out") if the stock price goes above a threshold ("barrier").

The basic idea of an accumulator contract is that the buyer speculates a company will trade between a certain price range (the range between the strike and the knock out price) within the contract period, and the issuer bets that stock will fall below the strike price. Note that the buyer holds an obligation to buy the shares at the strike price and not the option to buy. Likewise, the issuer holds an obligation to sell shares at the strike price.

== Contract specifications ==
Terms of the accumulator contract between two counterparties are specified in a term sheet. They will usually include the following:

- The Reference Shares ("the shares"), or the underlying security of the contract.
- The quantity and class of shares (if there are more than one class).
- The strike price, also called the exercise price. This is price at which the issuer will sell shares to the investor.
- The settlement dates, this is the dates on which shares will change hands from the Issuer to the buyer. There should be more than one settlement day in an accumulator contract, or else it will not be "accumulating".
- The knock out price, this sets the top limit price the underlying equity can reach before the contract is "knocked out" and whatever outstanding shares accumulated prior to that day are settled
- Shares per day, this is the maximum number of shares the buyer can "accumulate" per day.
- The trade day, this is the day the contract was sold/bought.
- The first accumulation day, this is the day that accumulation begins.
- The Initial Knock-out day, this is the first day that knock out can occur.
