= Inverse floating rate note =

Type of debt instrument

An inverse floating rate note, or simply an inverse floater, is a type of bond or other type of debt instrument used in finance whose coupon rate has an inverse relationship to short-term interest rates (or its reference rate). With an inverse floater, as interest rates rise the coupon rate falls. The basic structure is the same as an ordinary floating rate note except for the direction in which the coupon rate is adjusted. These two structures are often used in concert.

As short-term interest rates fall, both the market price and the yield of the inverse floater increase. This link often magnifies the fluctuation in the bond's price. However, in the opposite situation, when short-term interest rates rise, the value of the bond can drop significantly, and holders of this type of instrument may end up with a security that pays little interest and for which the market will pay very little. Thus, interest rate risk is magnified and contains a high degree of volatility.

== Creation ==
An inverse floating rate note can be created two ways. The first is by placing an existing or newly underwritten fixed-rate security into a trust and issuing both a floating rate note and an inverse floating rate note. The second method is for an investment banking firm to underwrite a fixed-rate security and then enter into an interest rate swap that has a maturity less than the bond's term. The investor would then own an inverse floater until the swap agreement expires. When creating an inverse floater through the swap market, the need to sell in inverse floaters through a Dutch auction is eliminated. In the first scenario the original security placed in trust is referred to as the collateral, from this collateral both the floater and inverse floater are created. The dealer will split up the underlying fixed-rate asset at a specified ratio (e.g. 20/80) and assign each portion to inverse and floater.

The reference rate and the frequency at which the rate is reset are contractually set. The rate used is often some form of LIBOR, but it can take different forms, such as tying it to the consumer price index, a housing price index, or an unemployment rate. The rate can be allowed to reset on an immediate, daily, or some type of monthly or yearly schedule. The rate can be computed by taking its set stated rate and subtracting the reference rate at the reset date. Caps and floors are often placed within inverse floaters to avoid unattractive features to investors (such as a negative coupon). Typically, the floor is set at zero and a cap may be set (e.g. 10%). If a floater is involved, a cap is put on the floater to match up with the inverse's floor, and vice versa. This is done since both are derived from the same fixed-rate asset.

== Issuers ==
Inverse floaters are issued in the collateralized mortgage obligation (CMO), municipal, and corporate markets.

=== CMO ===
The CMO market is the largest issuer of inverse floaters. The CMO inverse floater is considered a more complicated instrument to hedge and analyze, and is usually sold to sophisticated investors. The collateral in this market refers to mortgage-related products which create the CMO, this is known as "CMO collateral." The fixed-rate asset, or tranche, is used to create the floater and inverse floater is known as the "tranche collateral."

=== Municipal ===
In the municipal market, the investor of an inverse floater can purchase the corresponding floater at an auction and combine the two positions to essentially own the underlying asset. The investor can elect to split the issue again and retain the inverse floater portion. This option can be valuable to investors, but generally carries less yield than a comparable fixed-rate bond that does not carry this option. The ratio of floaters to inverse floaters is usually 50/50.

=== Corporate ===
Almost all corporate inverse floaters are issued as structured notes, which mean that they are part of an underlying swap transaction.

== Leverage and valuation ==
Additional valuation of an inverse floater can be determined by looking at the security's coupon leverage. To illustrate, suppose the creator of the floater and inverse floater divides the underlying collateral up into 100 bonds, 20 inverse an 80 floater bonds. The leverage in this structure is 4:1 of floater to inverse bonds. As such, the following relationship must hold:

$$\ 100(\mbox{collateral price}) = 20(\mbox{inverse price}) + 80(\mbox{floater price})$$

Based on this formula and value of the collateral, it can not be assumed that a decrease in the reference rate will automatically translate into a gain for the inverse floater. Such scenarios can be attributed to changes in the overall market and the yield curve that negatively impact the collateral's value.

== See also ==
- Auction rate security
- Collateralized debt obligation
- Float (finance)
- Inflation-indexed bond
- Structured note
  - Equity-linked note
  - Floating rate note
  - Credit-linked note
  - Market-linked note
