= Floater (disambiguation) =

A floater is a shadow-like shape that appears singly or together with several others in the field of vision of some individuals.

Floater may also refer to:

- Floater (band), a band based in Portland, Oregon
- Floater (geology), a loose rock that has been detached from its original source
- The Floaters, an R&B singing group of the 1970s
  - Floaters (album), 1977
- "Floater (Too Much to Ask)", a song from the 2001 Bob Dylan album Love and Theft
- Floating rate note, in finance, a bond with variable coupon rates
- Floating rib, a bone in the human rib cage not connected to the sternum
- Pie floater, an Australian meal comprising a meat pie floating in pea soup
- "Floater", another name for a "teardrop" or "runner" in basketball, in which a smaller offensive player performs a high arcing shot over the reach of taller defenders in the lane

== See also ==
- Float (disambiguation)
