= International Swaps and Derivatives Association =

Trade organization

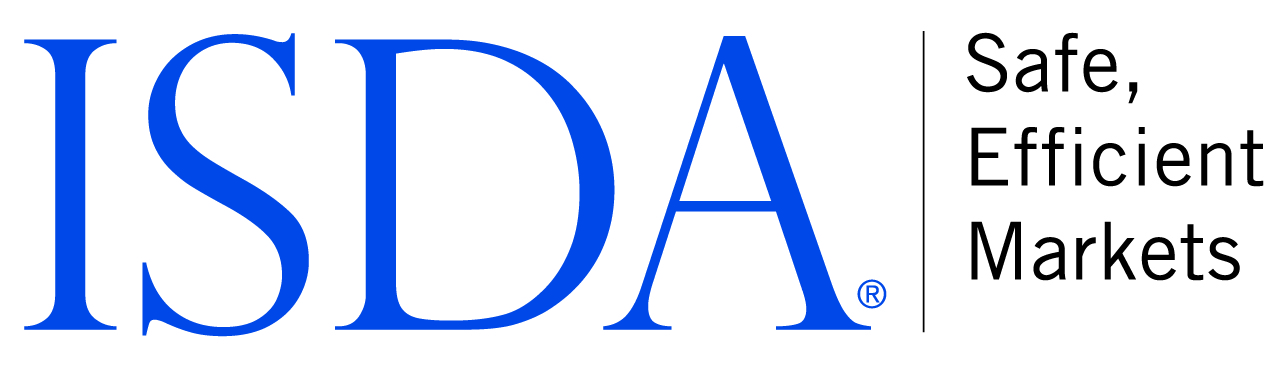
- Type: Trade association
- Founded: 1985; 41 years ago
- Headquarters: New York City
- Website: isda.org

The International Swaps and Derivatives Association (ISDA /ˈɪzdə/) is a trade organization of participants in the market for over-the-counter derivatives. It is headquartered in New York City.

It has created a standardized contract (the ISDA Master Agreement) to enter into derivatives transactions. In addition to legal and policy activities, ISDA manages FpML (Financial products Markup Language), an XML message standard for the OTC Derivatives industry. ISDA has more than 925 members in 75 countries; its membership consists of derivatives dealers, service providers and end users.

== History ==
ISDA was initially created in 1985 as the International Swap Dealers Associations, Inc. and subsequently changed its name switching "Swap Dealers" to "Swaps and Derivatives". This change was made to focus more attention on their efforts to improve the more broad derivatives markets and away from strictly interest rate swap contracts.

In 2009 a New York Times article mentioned that in 2005 the ISDA allowed rule changes to CDO payouts (Pay as You Go) that would benefit those who bet against (shorted) mortgage-backed securities, like Goldman Sachs, Deutsche Bank, and others.

ISDA has offices in New York, London, Hong Kong, Tokyo, Washington D.C., Brussels and Singapore. It has more than 800 member firms from six continents. The current Chief Executive Officer is Scott O'Malia, who joined ISDA in 2009.

== ISDA Master Agreement ==
The ISDA Master Agreement is typically used between a derivatives dealer and its counterparty when discussions begin surrounding a derivatives trade. There are two basic forms of Master Agreement: single jurisdiction/currency and multiple jurisdiction/currency. One of these documents is generally combined with a Schedule to set out the basic trading terms between the parties; each subsequent trade is then recorded in a Confirmation which references the Master Agreement and Schedule. The terms of the Schedule are often negotiated, and many firms have preferred versions of the Schedule.

According to Financial Times reporter Stacy-Marie Ishmael, the Master Agreement is "fundamental to, and provides a template for, the derivatives market."

ISDA has also drafted a Tahawwut Master Agreement in cooperation with the International Islamic Financial Market, with the aim of standardizing derivatives transactions under Islamic law.

=== Versions ===
The ISDA Master Agreement was first published in 1992, and a second edition was published in 2002. The second edition was drafted in response to market difficulties in the late 1990s, and could be adopted either in a unified form or as standard form amendments to the first edition. Key changes in the second edition include:

- Shortening the grace period for payment defaults from three business days to one business day [Refer Section 5 (a)(i) of 2002 version]
- Introduction of a force majeure provision as a termination event
- Introduction of a set-off provision [Included in the 2002 version in Section 6(f)]
- Conformation of jurisdiction clause to the Brussels Regime
- Introduction of Close-out Amount

On April 8, 2009, ISDA introduced further compulsory modifications known as the "Big Bang Protocol." The key changes introduced by this protocol include:

- Introduction of "auction settlement" to eliminate the need for credit event protocols to settle CDS transactions
- Automatic incorporation of Determinations Committee resolutions into the terms of standard CDS contracts
- "Look back" provisions, also known as "backstop dates," which institute a common standard effective date for CDS transactions

The Protocol also introduced more standardized terms in order to limit the scope of negotiation in individual CDS transactions, thus making individual contracts more fungible in trading.

ISDA's report commissioned by the "UK Financial Services Authority on behalf of the international group of OTC derivative supervisors asked ISDA in October 2009 to conduct a broad market review of bilateral collateralization practices for OTC derivatives to facilitate better understanding of current market practice, especially as it relates to the different types of counterparties active in the market."(ISDA 2010, p. 2)

=== Netting ===
Possibly the most important aspect of the ISDA Master Agreement is that the Master Agreement and all the Confirmations entered into under it form a single agreement. This is very important (especially for regulated financial companies) as it allows the parties to an ISDA Master Agreement to aggregate the amounts owing by each of them under all of the Transactions outstanding under that ISDA Master Agreement and replace them with a single net amount payable by one party to the other. Netting, dealt with under section 2(c) of the ISDA Master Agreement, allows the parties to net out amounts payable on the same day and in the same currency.

The more important use of netting is close-out netting under Section 6(e) of the ISDA Master Agreement. Pursuant to this section, when an ISDA Master Agreement (or, more accurately the outstanding Transactions under it) is terminated (normally following a credit event of some kind), the value of each of the Terminated Transactions is assessed (there are several ways this can be done, but the most usual measure is to determine how much it would cost for a party to enter into a Transaction having commercial terms identical to the Terminated Transaction with an independent third party - this is called the Settlement Amount) and converted into the Termination Currency (which should have been specified in the schedule to the ISDA Master Agreement) and any outstanding Unpaid Amounts are taken into account. The Settlement Amounts (which may be positive or negative depending which party is 'in-the-money' with respect to a particular Terminated Transaction) and unpaid amounts (again positive or negative, depending on who owes them) are added up and a single figure in the Termination Currency is determined payable by one party or the other. The enforceability of the close-out netting provisions is absolutely vital to financial institutions active in the derivatives market since the ability to net allows them to allocate capital only against the net figure they would have to pay on close-out of an ISDA Master Agreement rather than the gross amount. ISDA has obtained legal opinions from all important jurisdictions confirming the effectiveness of the close-out netting provisions in those jurisdictions. Members of ISDA are entitled to rely on these opinions.

ISDA also produces a model "Netting Act" which can be adopted by jurisdictions where close-out netting does not work effectively at present.

=== Credit support annex (CSA) ===
ISDA also produces a credit support annex which further permits parties to an ISDA Master Agreement to mitigate their credit risk by requiring the party which is 'out-of-the-money' to post collateral (usually cash, government securities or highly rated bonds) corresponding to the amount which would be payable by that party were all the outstanding Transactions under the relevant ISDA Master Agreement terminated. Collateral other than cash is usually discounted for risk, that is, the pledgor would have to post collateral in excess of the potential settlement amount.

== ISDAFIX ==
From 1998 until August 2014, ISDA was responsible for releasing a series of interest rate swap reference rates for four currencies (Euros, British pounds, Swiss francs, U.S. dollars) under the name ISDAfix. Following rate manipulation scandals, these rates are now administered by the Intercontinental Exchange (ICE). Further, the Swiss francs rate is no longer reported.

== Credit events and determinations committees ==
ISDA has five Determinations Committees, each having jurisdiction over a specific region of the world (the Americas, Asia excluding Japan, Australia/New Zealand, EMEA and Japan). Each committee consists of ten voting dealers and five voting non-dealer asset managers. The committees make official, binding determinations regarding the existence of "credit events" and "succession events" (such as mergers), which may trigger obligations under a credit default swap contract.

Since July 2009, the primary means of resolving a credit event is auction settlement, where holders of applicable instruments (as decided by the relevant determinations committee) auction their instruments to potential buyers at a set price.

In March 2012, ISDA issued a statement declaring that Greece, through passing legislation that forces losses on all its private creditors, has triggered the payment on default insurance contracts, thus instigating a credit event. The ISDA said the use of "collective action clauses (CACs) to amend the terms of Greek law-governed bonds issued by The Hellenic Republic such [as] the right of all holders of the Affected Bonds to receive payments has been reduced."

== Definitions ==
ISDA also creates industry standards for derivatives and provides legal definitions of terms used in contracts. An example is the 1999 ISDA Credit Derivatives Definitions, which provide basic definitions for credit default swaps, total return swaps, credit linked notes and other credit derivative transactions.

A controversy resulted over the definition of a "restructuring event" in connection with the August 2000 restructuring of USD 2.8 billion of debt by an insurance company. This prompted complaints from protection sellers in credit default swaps, who had to compensate for an event that was seen as normal in the credit business. There was also a fear of a conflict of interest, since protection buyers had nothing to lose by agreeing to restructuring. (Protection buyers included some of the insurance company's lenders.)

== See also ==
- Swap (finance)
- National Futures Association
- Credit default swap
- Currency swap
- Foreign exchange swap
- Interest rate swap
- Swap Execution Facility
- Central counterparty clearing
- Clearing house (finance)
- List of acronyms: European sovereign-debt crisis
