= Total return swap =

Financial contract which transfers an underlying asset's credit and market risks

Diagram explaining total return swap

In finance, a total return swap (TRS), total rate of return swap (TRORS), or cash-settled equity swap is a financial contract that transfers both the credit risk and market risk of an underlying asset.

== Contract definition ==
A swap agreement in which one party makes payments based on a set rate, either fixed or variable, while the other party makes payments based on the return of an underlying asset, which includes both the income it generates and any capital gains. In total return swaps, the underlying asset, referred to as the reference asset, is usually an equity index, loans, or bonds. This is owned by the party receiving the set rate payment.

Total return swaps allow the party receiving the total return to gain exposure and benefit from a reference asset without actually having to own it. These swaps are popular with hedge funds because they get the benefit of a large exposure with a minimal cash outlay.

In a total return swap, an investment bank could buy assets for a hedge fund, which is paid returns from the assets. The hedge fund can thereby remain anonymous insofar as the investment bank is the owner. If the value of the assets drop considerably, and the hedge fund is unable to provide more collateral on a margin call from the investment bank, the investment bank can sell the assets.

High-cost borrowers who seek financing and leverage, such as hedge funds, are natural receivers in Total Return Swaps. Lower cost borrowers, with large balance sheets, are natural payers.

Less common, but related, are the partial return swap and the partial return reverse swap agreements, which usually involve 50% of the return, or some other specified amount. Reverse swaps involve the sale of the asset with the seller then buying the returns, usually on equities.

== Advantage of using total return swaps ==
The TRORS allows one party (bank B) to derive the economic benefit of owning an asset without putting that asset on its balance sheet, and allows the other (bank A, which does retain that asset on its balance sheet) to buy protection against loss in its value.

TRORS can be categorised as a type of credit derivative, although the product combines both market risk and credit risk, and so is not a pure credit derivative.

== Users ==
Hedge funds use total return swaps to obtain leverage on the reference assets: they can receive the return of the asset, typically from a bank (which has a funding cost advantage), without having to put out the cash to buy the asset. They usually post a smaller amount of collateral upfront, thus obtaining leverage.

Hedge funds (such as The Children's Investment Fund (TCI)) have attempted to use total return swaps to side-step public disclosure requirements enacted under the Williams Act. As discussed in CSX Corp. v. The Children's Investment Fund Management, TCI argued that it was not the beneficial owner of the shares referenced by its total return swaps and therefore the swaps did not require TCI to publicly disclose that it had acquired a stake of more than 5% in CSX. The United States District Court rejected this argument and enjoined TCI from further violations of Section 13(d) Securities Exchange Act and the SEC-Rule promulgated thereunder.

Total return swaps are also very common in many structured finance transactions such as collateralized debt obligations (CDOs). CDO Issuers often enter TRS agreements as protection seller in order to leverage the returns for the structure's debt investors. By selling protection, the CDO gains exposure to the underlying asset(s) without having to put up capital to purchase the assets outright. The CDO gains the interest receivable on the reference asset(s) over the period while the counterparty mitigates their credit risk.

== See also ==
- Contract for difference
- Credit derivative
- Equity swap
- Financial risk management § Investment management
- Repurchase agreement
- Substance over form
- Usufruct
