= Coupon leverage =

Aspect of interest rates

Coupon leverage, or leverage factor, is the amount by which a reference rate is multiplied to determine the floating interest rate payable by an inverse floater. Some debt instruments leverage the particular effects of interest rate changes, most commonly in inverse floaters.

As an example, an inverse floater with a multiple may pay interest a rate, or coupon, of 22 percent minus the product of 2 times the 30-day SOFR (Secured Overnight Financing Rate). The coupon leverage is 2, in this example. The reference rate is the 30-day SOFR.

== Risk characteristics ==
Coupon leverage increases the sensitivity of an inverse floater's coupon payments, and therefore its market value, to changes in the underlying reference rate. A higher leverage factor means that a given movement in the reference rate produces a proportionally larger change in the coupon rate.

Because of this leveraged structure, inverse floaters are generally more volatile than comparable fixed-rate or standard floating-rate instruments. U.S. Securities and Exchange Commission filings commonly describe inverse floaters as investments that entail a degree of leverage and may cause gains and losses to be magnified in response to interest-rate movements.
