= Credit-linked note =

Form of funded credit derivative

A Credit Linked Note (CLN) is a structured product typically issued by a financial institution, such as banks or SPV. It is structured as a financial instrument that combines a bond and a credit derivative, the bond represents the equivalent of the funding leg, that is how much the bank pays for an investor to borrow money from it, and the credit derivative the risk overlay. The core function of a CLN is to transfer a specific credit risk, knows as reference entity, from the issuer to the investor. In return for taking this credit risk, the investor receive an enhanced yield, or higher coupons compared to a vanilla bond with a similar maturity.

The note's cash flows are contingent upon the absence of a credit event related to the reference entity. On most of CLN's, a credit event is strictly defined by the ISDA definitions, which are incorporated into the CLN's legal documentation. Standard ISDA credit events include Failure to Pay, Bankruptcy and Restructuring of the reference entity. If no credit event occurs during the life of the note, the investor receives periodic coupon payments and the full return of principal at maturity. If a defined credit event occurs, the note is terminated, and the investor suffers a loss on the principal, in that case the investors receive a recovery rate. Recovery can also be fixed, most of the time at 0% as investors looking for yield, market recovery are also priced, and for investors looking for safer investments, principal can be non-risky to reference entity, only coupons will remain risky.

The purpose of the arrangement is to pass the risk of specific default onto investors willing to bear that risk in return for the higher yield it makes available.

The performance of a CLN is subject to two main risks: the credit risk of the reference entity and the counterparty risk of the issuer itself.

== Emerging market credit linked note ==
The emerging market credit linked note, also sometimes called a "clean", are traded by buy side clients to gain access to local debt markets for several reasons. First, is that a direct investment in the sovereign debt may not be legal due to domicile restrictions of the country. One instance would be the local government requiring the purchaser of debt to have a business office in the country, another instance would be tax restrictions or tariffs in countries with NDF currencies. A fund in USD would have difficulty repatriating the currency if local restrictions or taxes made it undesirable. When this occurs, the sell side global bank purchases the debt and structures it into a derivative note then issued to the client or clients. The client then owns the issued security, which derives its total return from the underlying instrument. A CDS, credit default swap, is embedded in the instrument. It can be thought of as a fully funded total return swap where the underlying asset total return is exchanged for a funding fee as well as the cost of the issued CLN. From a market risk perspective owning a CLN is almost identical to owning the local debt.

However downstream, in the back office, difficulties can arise from failure to appropriately control the risks associated from the lack of data and compatibility of accounting platforms. The issue stems from the bespoke nature of the CLN in that it is priced in USD but the underlying asset is denominated in another currency. Secondly, the sell side may price the CLN based on the issued asset in USD. This, in turn, does not appropriately reflect the Yield to Maturity of the underlying asset as it approaches par value at maturity. Thirdly, the underlying asset may be inflation linked, or have periodic paydowns that compound the first and third issues mentioned before.

Under this structure, the coupon or price of the note is linked to the performance of a reference asset. It offers borrowers a hedge against credit risk and gives investors a higher yield on the note for accepting exposure to a specified credit event.

== See also ==
- Credit
- Credit derivative
- Credit derivative risks
- Credit risk
- Structured product
- Structured note
  - Equity-linked note (ELN)
  - Floating rate note
  - Inverse floating rate note
  - Market-linked note
