= Credit event =

A credit event occurs when a person or organization defaults on a significant transaction. He or she is unable to honor the terms of the contract entered, and the borrower’s ability to pay comes into question. Because the marketplace recognizes such events as related to one's credit worthiness, credit events can trigger specific protections provided by credit derivatives (e.g. credit default swap, credit default swap index, credit default swap index tranche).

A credit event triggers a swap where oftentimes the borrower has to terminate the contract and accept a settlement instead of honoring the remaining terms, because the credit event that occurred has essentially forced them to do so when they default.

== Standard events ==
The events triggering a credit derivative are defined in a bilateral swap confirmation which is a transactional document that typically refers to an International Swaps and Derivatives Association (ISDA) master agreement previously executed between the two swap counterparties. The ISDA is a global trade organization for OTC derivatives, and provide the definitions and set the standard for what we consider to be credit events.

There are several standard credit events which are typically referred to in credit derivative transactions:

- Bankruptcy
- Failure to Pay
- Restructuring
- Repudiation
- Moratorium
- Obligation Acceleration
- Obligation Default

Credit events can have huge implications because they put lenders in a bad spot with high risk, where money and contractual obligations are lost or broken. These swaps are essentially insurance against non payment to where if a credit event occurs, the seller compensates the buyer. These swaps are a way for lenders to minimize risk and modify returns as they are provided insurance for the potential negative outcomes.

== Restructuring ==
A restructuring credit event, according to the ISDA, occurs when there is either a reduction in the interest rate or principal amount, a deferment or other postponement for payment, a change that causes subordination to obligations, or if there is any change in the composition of the payments interest and principal.

== Watchlists ==
The watchlists are a rating review created by the credit rating agencies that assist firms in avoiding entering into contracts that might experience a credit event. The watchlist is used for higher creditworthy borrowers to improve the delivery of information, however for borrowers with bad credit it acts as a red flag/warning sign for the firm to stay away from a risk inducing contract. This can reduce risk for firms before they enter into a bad contract, where they may experience a credit event and eventually be looking to sell it off to transfer risk. The watchlist can help firms see problems before they happen.
