= Structurer =

Investment banking professional

In investment banking, a structurer is the finance professional responsible for designing structured products. Their solution will typically deliver a bespoke hedge, "yield enhancement", or other feature, as appropriate to the client's needs, and must inhere relevant regulatory and accounting considerations; see Structured product § Product design and manufacture.

The role is usually quantitative, straddling that of sales and trading and front-office quantitative analyst. The structurer's main analytic task is to determine how the pay rules in question will distribute cash flows for a deal; to do so, they will typically build computer models to simulate these subsequent payments, thereby also estimating how collateral payments affect the cash flows.

The above is preliminary to deal settlement; thereafter it will be in the hands of the Bond administration to apply the rules as described in the deal legal documents.
