= Equity-linked note =

Financial instrument

An equity-linked note (ELN) is a debt instrument, usually a bond issued by a financial institution such as an investment bank or a subsidiary of a commercial bank. ELNs are liabilities of the issuer, but the final payout to the investor is based on an unrelated company's stock price, a stock index or a group of stocks or stock indices. The underlying stocks typically have large market capitalizations. Equity-linked notes are a type of structured product and are often marketed to unsophisticated retail investors.

Equity-linked notes come in various forms, including the following.

== Equity-linked put option ==
An equity-linked put option (ELPO) is a structured product composed of a deposit, and a short put option.

The underlying stock, exercise price and maturity date determine the principal and interest of the product. The face value of the product is the exercise price times the trading unit, for example, if the exercise price is $100 and the product is sold at 100 shares per lot, the face value of the product is $10000.

The product is sold at a discount, which is the option premium received by selling the put option. Using the example above, if the option premium is $2 (per share), the product is then sold at $9800.

On the expiry day, if the stock is trading at or above the exercise price, the option is not exercised and the investor receives the full face value of the product. ($10000 in the example). However, if the stock is trading below the exercise price, the investor receives the stock instead.

== Principal-guaranteed notes ==
A principal-guaranteed note (PGN) is a structured product composed of a zero-coupon bond and a long option, which may be a call option or put option. The product is principal-protected, i.e. the investor is guaranteed to receive at least 100% of the original amount.

The product is sold at the face value, where the discount on the zero-coupon bond is used to buy an option. If the underlying product goes in favour of the investor, the option is exercised to create additional return.

Usually, the final payout is the amount invested, plus the gain in the underlying stock or index times a note-specific participation rate, which can be more or less than 100%. For example, if the underlying equity gains 50% during the investment period and the participation rate is 80%, the investor receives 1.40 dollars for each dollar invested. If the equity remains unchanged or declines, the investor still receives one dollar per dollar invested (as long as the issuer does not default). Generally, the participation rate is better in longer maturity notes, since the total amount of interest given up by the investor is higher.

== Advantages and disadvantages ==
These investments are sometimes marketed as providing higher yields than bonds, but lower risk than stocks. Risks associated with equity-linked notes include:

- Coupon payments are less certain than those associated with a conventional bond, because they are contingent on the performance of the underlying asset. If the underlying asset performs poorly, the coupon payments paid to the investor could be reduced, interrupted or terminated.
- Equity-linked notes may contain relatively high fees which are difficult for investors to identify. An analysis performed by Morningstar, Inc. in 2021 found that the average embedded fee can be as high as 2.9%. Such fees may be deducted from the principal value of the note, in which case the investor would receive less than the face value of the investment at maturity.
- Most equity-linked notes are not liquid, i.e. not traded in secondary markets like conventional bonds or stocks. They are designed to be kept to maturity.
- If the issuer decides to "call", or redeem, the note prior to its maturity, the redemption price may be below the initial amount invested and the investor will not benefit from any future increases in the value of the underlying asset.

== See also ==
- Convertible bond
- Exchangeable bond
- Structured product
- Structured note
  - Floating rate note
  - Inverse floating rate note
  - Credit-linked note
  - Market-linked note
