= PRIIPS =

Range of investment products

Packaged retail investment and insurance products (PRIIPs) is European Union regulatory term to encompass a range of investment products that banks or other financial institutions offer to consumers. It was first used in regulation (EU) No 1286/2014, known as the PRIIPs regulation, the aim of which was to improve the transparency and comparability of investment products across the EU through mandating key information documents.

PRIIPs is used in the European Union as an alternative to savings accounts. In particular, PRIIPs include non-equity financial products such as bonds, insurance policies, mutual funds and structured funds, structured deposits, and structured products. As of 2018, these investment products make up a market in Europe worth up to €10 trillion.

== History ==
The EU regulatory project started in 2014 on the basis that retail investors across the EU often made investments without understanding the associated risks and costs, some of which led investors to suffer unforeseen losses.

The regulation was introduced in 2018 with aims to protect retail investors by adopting some key-principles: - comparability: the investment prospectus has to allow direct comparison between different products that meet a retail investor’s stated aims; - synthesis: the key-information has to be contained in a prospectus of maximum three pages; - know your products: regulations has to set out new calculation methodologies in order to ensure risk-return transparency of the investment products; - standardization: the key-information document has to be valid across the EU and report homogeneous statements.

The regulation was made as a result of surveys and consultations conducted by the European Commission. These activities were to test the effectiveness of presented information to retail investors within the PRIIPs framework The information presented during the test recalled the need of reporting performance scenarios about the investment

This probabilistic scenarios approach was originally developed by Marcello Minenna within “a quantitative framework to assess the risk-return of non-equity products”

Contributions in support of the probabilistic approach arrived from the Movement for risk transparency (i.e.: a group of academics, consumers associations, unions and other representatives of investors’ interests)

The new regulations were issued in 2018 and provided the obligation for the product manufacturers to elaborate for each investment product a Key-Information-Document of no more than 3 pages that would include a general description of the provider, an explanation of the main factors that the investment's return depends upon, the level of risk associated with the product (classed from 1 to 7), an indication of the possible maximum loss (including four performance scenarios), and a table explaining the costs of one's investment over time.
