= Option naming convention =

Method in financial markets to identify the option which is being quoted or traded

In financial markets, an option naming convention is a method of identifying which of many possible options is being quoted or traded.

== Standard Equity Option Convention ==
US equity options, typically cleared by the Options Clearing Corporation, underwent an initiative between 2008 and 2010 to change the standard symbology. The proposed revision was meant to address several deficiencies with the old standard convention described below. In particular:

- Lack of uniformity for LEAP option convention (i.e. options with maturity greater than one year)
- Use of illogical identifiers for both options and underliers
- Difficulties encountered when rolling LEAP options to standard options as they age.
- Ambiguous naming, such as when options for both 105 strike and 205 strike exist on the same expiration for an underlier.

The new symbology does away with the letter codes for strike and expiration, and instead employ a 21-byte series key in the style of Root symbol (ticker symbol) + Expiration Year (yy) + Expiration Month (mm) + Expiration Day (dd) + Call/Put Indicator (C or P) + Strike Price:

- Symbol (max. 6 characters)
- Year (yy)
- Month (mm)
- Day (dd)
- Call or Put (C/P)
- Strike Price (#####.###) listed with five digits before the decimal and three digits following the decimal

For example, an April 16, 2015 $30.00 Call Option on Yahoo would be listed as "YHOO150416C00030000".

All options that settle into the same underlier (e.g. 100 shares of the underlier) share the same symbol field.

== Old convention ==
Prior to 2010, standard equity option naming convention in North America, as used by the Options Clearing Corporation, was as follows:

For example, an Apple Inc AAPL.O call option that would have expired in December 2007 at a $122.50 strike price would be displayed as APVLZ in old convention (AAPL071222C00122500 in new convention).

Stock option names are written in the following format: SYMBOL+MONTH+STRIKE

- SYMBOL = Option Root Symbol, normally the stock's ticker symbol
- MONTH = Month the option expires
- STRIKE = Strike price

=== Expiration Month Codes ===
Month	Call	Put
January	A	M
February	B	N
March	C	O
April	D	P
May	E	Q
June	F	R
July	G	S
August	H	T
September	I	U
October	J	V
November	K	W
December	L	X

=== Strike Price Codes ===
Code	Strike Prices						Code	Strike Prices					
A	5	105	205	305	405	505	N	70	170	270	370	470	570
B	10	110	210	310	410	510	O	75	175	275	375	475	575
C	15	115	215	315	415	515	P	80	180	280	380	480	580
D	20	120	220	320	420	520	Q	85	185	285	385	485	585
E	25	125	225	325	425	525	R	90	190	290	390	490	590
F	30	130	230	330	430	530	S	95	195	295	395	495	595
G	35	135	235	335	435	535	T	100	200	300	400	500	600
H	40	140	240	340	440	540	U	7.5	37.5	67.5	97.5	127.5	157.5
I	45	145	245	345	445	545	V	12.5	42.5	72.5	102.5	132.5	162.5
J	50	150	250	350	450	550	W	17.5	47.5	77.5	107.5	137.5	167.5
K	55	155	255	355	455	555	X	22.5	52.5	82.5	112.5	142.5	172.5
L	60	160	260	360	460	560	Y	27.5	57.5	87.5	117.5	147.5	177.5
M	65	165	265	365	465	565	Z	32.5	62.5	92.5	122.5	152.5	182.5
