= Floating rate note =

Bonds that have a variable coupon

Floating rate notes (FRNs) are bonds that have a variable coupon, equal to a money market reference rate, like SOFR or federal funds rate, plus a quoted spread (also known as quoted margin). The spread is a rate that remains constant. Almost all FRNs have quarterly coupons, i.e. they pay out interest every three months. At the beginning of each coupon period, the coupon is calculated by taking the fixing of the reference rate for that day and adding the spread. A typical coupon would look like 3 months USD SOFR +0.20%.

== Issuers ==
In the United States, banks and financial service companies have been among the largest issuers of these securities. The U.S. Treasury began issuing them in 2014, and government sponsored enterprises (GSEs) such as the Federal Home Loan Banks, the Federal National Mortgage Association (Fannie Mae) and the Federal Home Loan Mortgage Corporation (Freddie Mac) are important issuers. In Europe, the main issuers are banks.

== Variations ==
Some FRNs have special features such as maximum or minimum coupons, called "capped FRNs" and "floored FRNs". Those with both minimum and maximum coupons are called "collared FRNs".

"Perpetual FRNs" are another form of FRNs that are also called irredeemable or unrated FRNs and are akin to a form of capital.

FRNs can also be obtained synthetically by the combination of a fixed rate bond and an interest rate swap. This combination is known as an asset swap.

- Perpetual notes (PRN)
- Variable rate notes (VRN)
- Structured FRN
- Reverse FRN
- Capped FRN
- Floored FRN
- Collared FRN
- Step up recovery FRN (SURF)
- Range/corridor/accrual notes
- Leveraged/deleveraged FRN

A deleveraged floating-rate note is one bearing a coupon that is the product of the index and a leverage factor, where the leverage factor is between zero and one. A deleveraged floater, which gives the investor decreased exposure to the underlying index, can be replicated by buying a pure FRN and entering into a swap to pay floating and receive fixed, on a notional amount of less than the face value of the FRN.

Deleveraged FRN = long pure FRN + short (1 - leverage factor) x swap

A leveraged or super floater gives the investor increased exposure to an underlying index: the leverage factor is always greater than one. Leveraged floaters also require a floor, since the coupon rate can never be negative.

Leveraged FRN = long pure FRN + long (leverage factor - 1) x swap + long (leverage factor) x floor

== Risks ==
=== Credit risk ===
Floating-rate notes issued by corporations, such as banks and financial firms, are subject to credit risk, depending on the credit-worthiness of the issuer. Those issued by the U.S. Treasury, which entered the market in 2014, are traditionally regarded as having minimal credit risk.

=== Interest rate risk ===
Opinion is divided as to the efficacy of floating-rate notes in protecting the investor from interest rate risk. Some believe that these securities carry little interest rate risk because 1) a floating rate note's Macaulay Duration is approximately equal to the time remaining until the next interest rate adjustment; therefore its price shows very low sensitivity to changes in market rates; and 2) when market rates rise, the expected coupons of the FRN increase in line with the increase in forward rates, which means its price remains constant, as compared to fixed rate bonds, whose prices decline when market rates rise. This point of view holds that floating rate notes are conservative investments for investors who believe market rates will increase.

A somewhat different view is held by author Dr. Annette Thau: "The rationale for floaters is that as interest rates change, resetting the coupon rate... will tend to maintain the price of the bond at or close to par. In practice this has tended not to work out quite as well as had been hoped, for a number of reasons. First, during times of extreme interest rate volatility, rates are not reset quickly enough to prevent price fluctuations. Secondly, the coupon rates of floaters are usually well below those of long-term bonds and often not very attractive when compared to shorter maturity bonds."

=== Complexity ===
Commenting on the complexity of these securities, Richard S. Wilson of the credit rating firm Fitch Investors Services noted: "Financial engineers worked overtime on floating-rate securities and have created debt instruments with a variety of terms and features different from those of conventional fixed-coupon bonds....The major investment firms with their worldwide trading capabilities participate in these markets 24 hours a day. But floaters are complex instruments, and investors who don't understand them should stay away. This applies to individuals as well as institutional portfolio managers."

== Trading ==
Securities dealers make markets in FRNs. They are traded over-the-counter, instead of on a stock exchange. In Europe, most FRNs are liquid, as the biggest investors are banks. In the U.S., FRNs are mostly held to maturity, so the markets aren't as liquid. In the wholesale markets, FRNs are typically quoted as a spread over the reference rate.

=== Example ===
Suppose a new 5 year FRN pays a coupon of 3 months SOFR +0.20%, and is issued at par (100.00). If the perception of the credit-worthiness of the issuer goes down, investors will demand a higher interest rate, say SOFR +0.25%. If a trade is agreed, the price is calculated. In this example, SOFR +0.25% would be roughly equivalent to a price of 99.75. This can be calculated as par, minus the difference between the coupon and the price that was agreed (0.05%), multiplied by the maturity (5 year).

== Yield measures ==
Metrics such as yield to maturity and internal rate of return cannot be used to estimate the potential return from a floating rate note. That is the case because it is impossible to forecast the stream of coupon payments with accuracy, since they are tied to a benchmark that is constantly subject to change. Instead, metrics known as the effective spread and the simple margin can be used.

=== Effective spread ===
The effective spread is the average margin over the benchmark rate that is expected to be earned over the life of the security. For a floating rate note selling at par value, the effective margin is merely the contractual spread over the benchmark rate specified in the note's prospectus.

For notes that sell at a discount or premium, finance scholar Dr. Frank Fabozzi outlines a present value approach: project the future coupon cash flows assuming that the benchmark rate does not change and find the discount rate that makes the present value of the future cash flows equal to the market price of the note. That discount rate is the effective spread. This approach takes into account the premium or discount to par value and the time value of money, but suffers from the simplifying assumption that holds the benchmark rate at a single value for the life of the note.

=== Simple margin ===
A simpler approach begins with computing the sum of the quoted spread of the FRN and the capital gain (or loss) an investor will earn if the note is held to maturity:

$\frac{100 - \text{Clean price}}{\text{Maturity in years} } + \text{Spread}.$

Second, adjust the above for the fact that the note is bought at a discount or premium to the nominal value:

$\frac{100}{\text{Clean price}} \times \left(\frac{100 - \text{Clean price}}{\text{Maturity in years} } + \text{Spread}\right).$

== See also ==
- Fixed rate bond
- Structured note
  - Equity-linked note
  - Inverse floating rate note
  - Credit-linked note
  - Market-linked note
