= The Big Short (film) =

2015 film by Adam McKay

- Theatrical release poster
- Directed by: Adam McKay
- Screenplay by: Charles Randolph; Adam McKay
- Based on: The Big Short by Michael Lewis
- Produced by: Brad Pitt; Dede Gardner; Jeremy Kleiner; Arnon Milchan
- Starring: Christian Bale; Steve Carell; Ryan Gosling; Brad Pitt
- Cinematography: Barry Ackroyd
- Edited by: Hank Corwin
- Music by: Nicholas Britell
- Production companies: Paramount Pictures; Regency Enterprises; Plan B Entertainment
- Distributed by: Paramount Pictures
- Release dates: November 12, 2015 (AFI Fest); December 11, 2015 (United States)
- Running time: 130 minutes
- Country: United States
- Language: English
- Budget: $50 million
- Box office: $133 million

The Big Short is a 2015 American biographical comedy drama film directed by Adam McKay from a screenplay by McKay and Charles Randolph. Based on the 2010 book by Michael Lewis, it depicts how the 2008 financial crisis was triggered by the United States housing bubble. The film stars Christian Bale, Steve Carell, Ryan Gosling, and Brad Pitt, with John Magaro, Finn Wittrock, Hamish Linklater, Rafe Spall, Jeremy Strong, and Marisa Tomei in supporting roles.

The Big Short began a limited release in the United States on December 11, 2015, followed by a wide release on December 23 by Paramount Pictures. A critical and commercial success, the film grossed $133 million on a $50 million budget and received acclaim for the performances of the cast (particularly those of Bale and Carell), McKay's direction, editing, and the screenplay. The film won the Academy Award for Best Adapted Screenplay in addition to nominations for Best Picture, Best Director, Best Supporting Actor (Bale), and Best Film Editing. The film was also nominated for four Golden Globe awards (Best Performance by an Actor in a Motion Picture - Musical or Comedy (Bale, Carell), Best Screenplay - Motion Picture (Randolph), and Best Motion Picture - Musical or Comedy).

== Plot ==
In 2005, eccentric hedge fund manager Michael Burry discovers that the U.S. housing market is extremely unstable due to subprime loans. He draws this conclusion after recognizing similarities to the 1930s crisis and calculates that the market will collapse in 2007. Burry then meets with several major investment and commercial banks to purchase credit default swaps, but is required to pay substantial monthly premiums. The high premiums cause Lawrence Fields, Burry's principal client, to accost him for the high premiums that will bankrupt Burry's fund in a couple of years if his conclusion is wrong, though Burry holds firm.

A Deutsche Bank executive later mentions Burry's dealings to his co-worker Jared Vennett. Vennett, sensing an opportunity, tries to secure investors for shorting the market, erroneously calling a trader at FrontPoint Partners who are nonetheless interested in his pitch. Vennett explains the fraud in the market and the disingenuity of seemingly safe bonds. Mark Baum, the head of FrontPoint, is moved by Vennett's pitch due to his disenchantment with banking's business model. The FrontPoint team travels to south Florida to investigate the veracity of Vennett's claims — finding empty neighborhoods and meeting with mortgage brokers who admit to fraudulent practices — and then decide to invest with Vennett.

Meanwhile, young investors Charlie Geller and Jamie Shipley accidentally discover Vennett's presentation on a coffee table in the lobby of JPMorgan Chase. They are immediately convinced as they see the high potential payouts, but the small size of their fund requires them to enlist Ben Rickert, Shipley's neighbor and a retired securities trader. Rickert agrees to help and the trio begin investing in credit default swaps.

As defaults increase in early 2007, the values of credit default swaps and collateralized debt obligations (CDOs) inexplicably rise and their credit rating remains stable. Burry struggles with the lack of payout and he restricts withdrawals, leading Fields to sue. Baum talks to an acquaintance at Standard & Poor's, finding dishonesty amongst the credit rating agencies to maintain business with investment banks. Geller suspects the banks are committing fraud, leading him, Shipley and Rickert to visit the American Securitization Forum, where bankers are unconcerned about defaults. Shipley learns that the SEC has no regulations governing mortgage-backed securities activity. Geller convinces Shipley and Rickert to bet against higher-rated tranches of the bonds, since they are likely to fail if the lower-rated bonds fail. Vennett and the FrontPoint team also attend the Forum, where Baum learns from a CDO manager that the market for synthetic CDOs is twenty times larger than the market for the mortgages themselves, leading Baum to realize the entire world economy is set to collapse.

Geller and Shipley see that New Century Financial, a leader in subprime lending has filed for bankruptcy, and they identify it as the beginning of the housing bubble bursting. At the same time, Baum finds that Bear Stearns is liquidating hedge funds and Burry has his phone calls ignored by the banks. Geller and Shipley realise that for the prices to have remained stable despite defaults continuing to increase, the banks must be freezing the prices of their securities in order to sell and short them before the market crashes. Outraged, Geller and Shipley contact an old friend who works for The Wall Street Journal, but he declines to report the story to preserve his relationships with the investment banks.

As the subprime bonds continue to fall, Baum learns that Morgan Stanley, who owns FrontPoint, has also taken short positions against mortgage derivatives. However, it had sold short positions in higher-rated mortgage derivatives to offset the risk. Because even the higher-rated derivatives are collapsing in value, Morgan Stanley is facing severe liquidity problems. Despite pressure from his staff to sell their positions before Morgan Stanley collapses, Baum refuses to sell. Rickert, on vacation in England, sells Geller and Shipley's positions; the two receive huge profits but lose their faith in the system as Ben informs them that foreign bank systems are beginning to crash as well. Burry begins receiving calls from the banks he had originally taken short positions against. Burry yields a profit of $2.69 billion, with Fields alone receiving $489 million. While Baum is speaking at an industry panel, his team learns that Bear Stearns stock has fallen 38% in just ten minutes and the bank collapses shortly after. Baum is the last to sell, making over $1 billion, but laments that the banks and government will not take responsibility for the crisis.

Vennett receives a large bonus for the profits he generated. FrontPoint continues to operate as per usual, but Burry closes his fund after public backlash. Geller and Shipley go their separate ways after unsuccessfully trying to sue the ratings agencies and Rickert returns to his retirement. Just prior to the credits, it is noted that most banks responsible for the crisis face no consequences for their actions, with one single trader, Kareem Serageldin, being imprisoned and that banks are again selling CDOs under a new label of the bespoke tranche opportunity.

== Cast ==
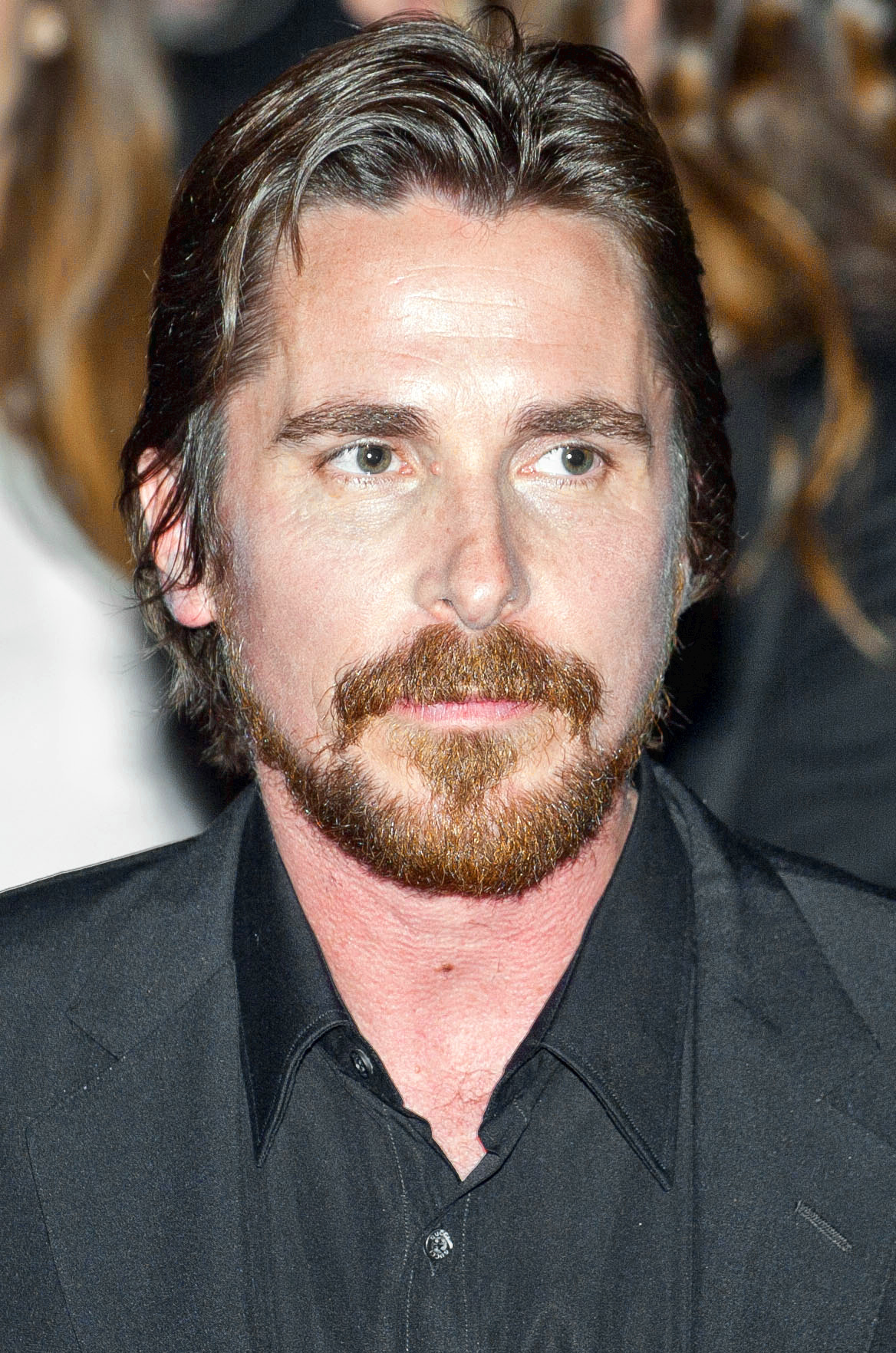
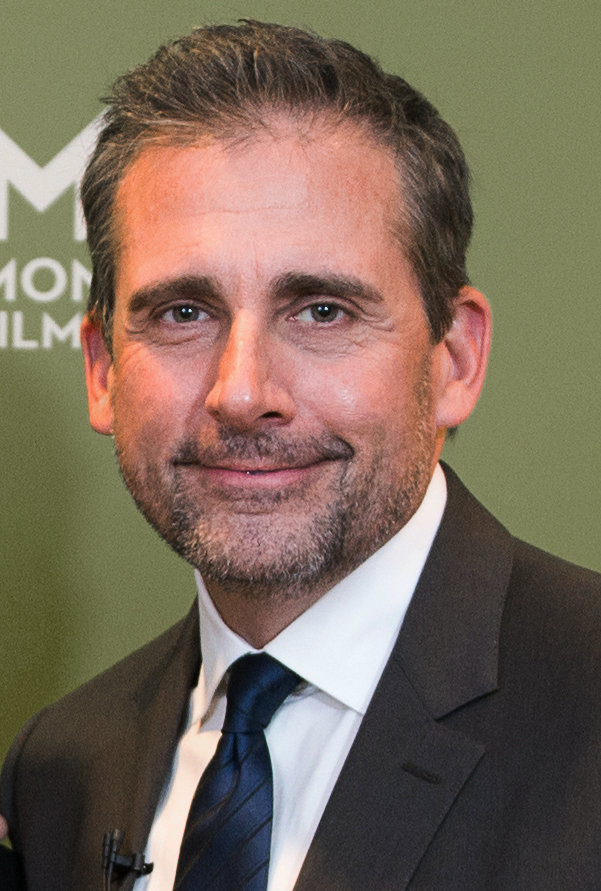
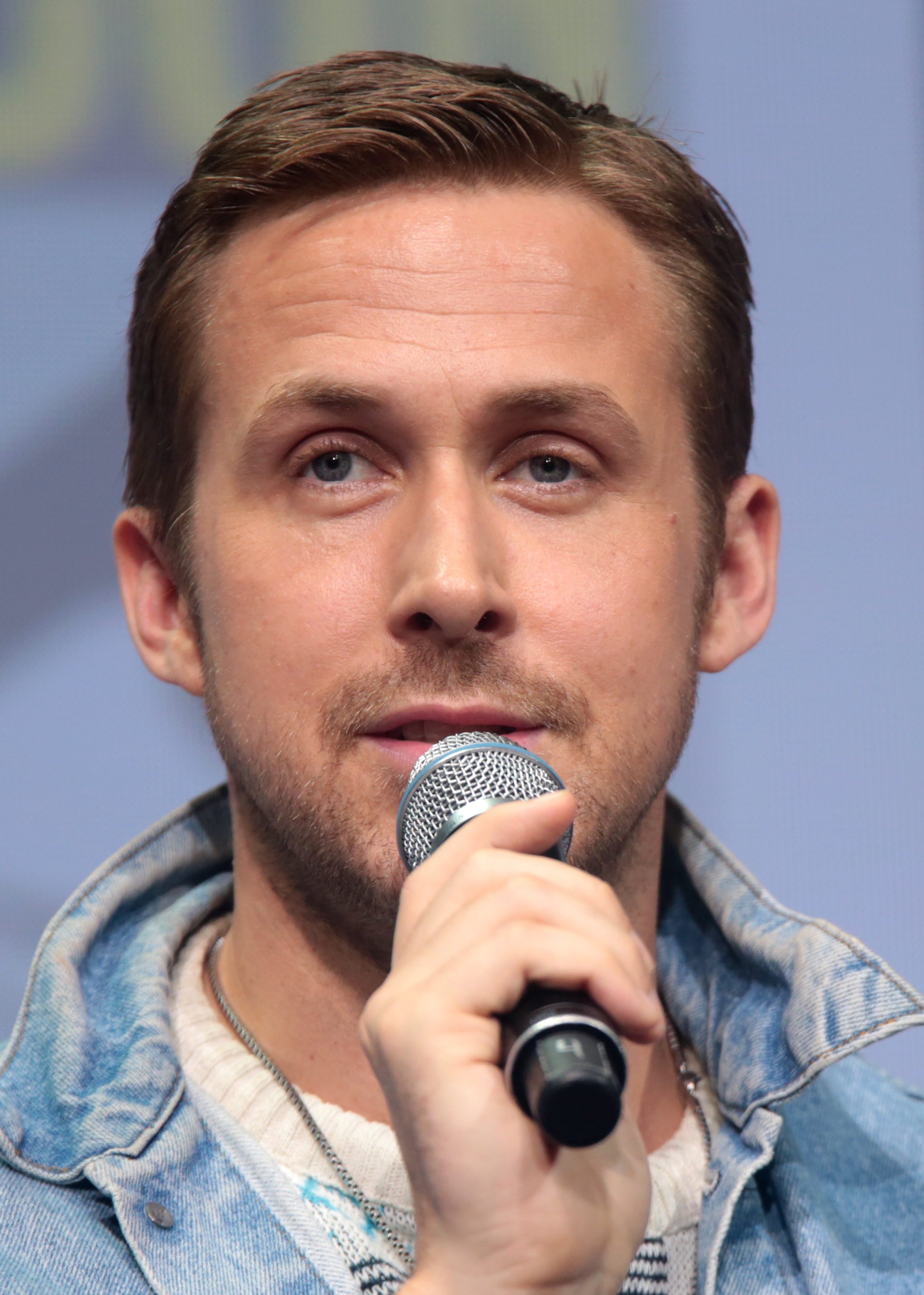
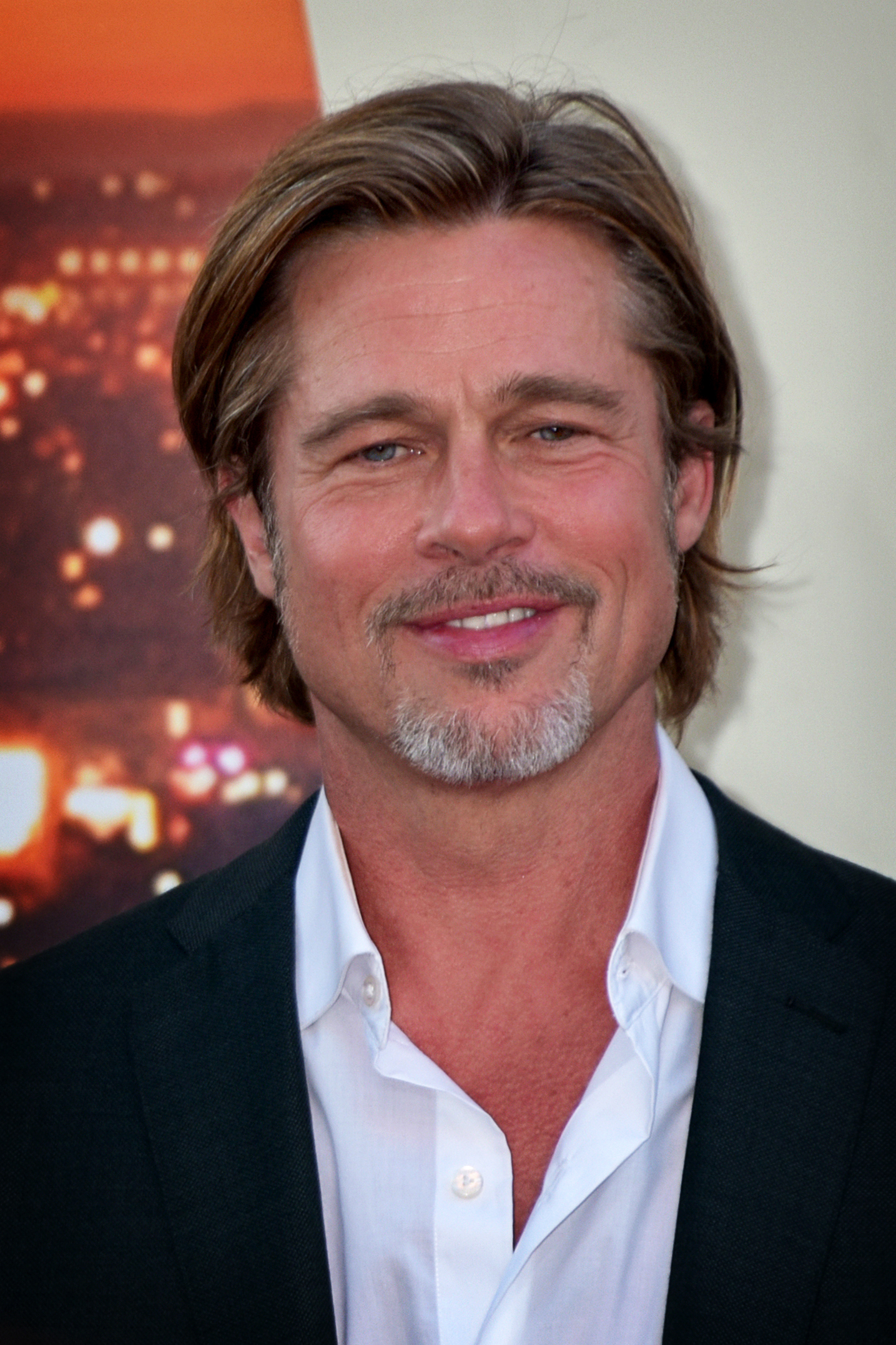
The main cast of the film: Christian Bale, Steve Carell, Ryan Gosling and Brad Pitt
- Christian Bale as Michael Burry, one of the first people to discover the American housing market bubble. Burry operates his own hedge fund, Scion Capital, and uses his liquidity to short the housing market. The real Burry appears in a cameo as a worker at Scion Capital.
- Steve Carell as Mark Baum, the leader of FrontPoint Partners, a small independent trading firm. Baum is in a state of constant disgust with the American banks. The character is based on Steve Eisman.
- Ryan Gosling as Jared Vennett, a salesman from Deutsche Bank who decides to sell Burry's credit default swaps for his own profit. The character is based on Greg Lippmann.
- Brad Pitt as Ben Rickert, a retired former trader who helps Jamie and Charlie with their trades. The character is based on Ben Hockett.
- John Magaro as Charlie Geller, one half of Brownfield Fund (based on Cornwall Capital), who discover Vennett's prospectus and also decide to short the housing market. The character is based on Charlie Ledley.
- Finn Wittrock as Jamie Shipley, Charlie's partner in Brownfield Fund. The character is based on James Mai.
- Hamish Linklater as Porter Collins, a member of Baum's team at FrontPoint.
- Rafe Spall as Danny Moses, a member of Baum's team at FrontPoint.
- Jeremy Strong as Vinny Daniel, a member of Baum's team at FrontPoint.
- Marisa Tomei as Cynthia Baum, Mark Baum's wife.
- Tracy Letts as Lawrence Fields, an investor in Burry's hedge fund. The character is a fictional composite of Joel Greenblatt and other investors with Scion who disagreed with his strategy.
- Adepero Oduye as Kathy Tao, an employee of Morgan Stanley who oversees Baum's fund.
- Karen Gillan as Evie, an employee of the SEC and Jamie's brother's ex-girlfriend, whom he meets with in Las Vegas.
- Byron Mann as a CDO manager whom Baum interviews in Las Vegas, based on Wing Chau.
- Melissa Leo as Georgia Hale, an employee of Standard and Poor's who admits to giving inaccurate ratings for bonds. The character is based on Ernestine Warner.
- Jae Suh Park as Burry's wife.
- Max Greenfield and Billy Magnussen as mortgage brokers taking advantage of people looking for homes.
- Stanley Wong as Ted Jiang, a quantitative analyst working for Jared Vennett. The character is based on Eugene Xu.

Several celebrities appear as themselves throughout the film in interstitials to explain different financial aspects of the film: Margot Robbie appears to explain mortgage-backed securities, Anthony Bourdain to detail collateralized debt obligations, and Richard Thaler and Selena Gomez to describe credit default swaps and synthetic CDOs.

== Production ==
=== Development ===
In 2013, Paramount acquired the rights to the 2010 non-fiction book The Big Short: Inside the Doomsday Machine by Michael Lewis, to develop it into a film, which Brad Pitt's Plan B Entertainment would produce. On March 24, 2014, Adam McKay was hired to write and direct a film about the housing and economic bubble. Screenwriter Charles Randolph, who co-wrote the film with McKay, said one of the first challenges was finding the right tone for the film. He told Creative Screenwriting, "In general it was trying to find the right tone that was slightly funnier than your average Miloš Forman comedy, which is all grounded character-based but not so satirical where you got Wag the Dog. Somewhere between there was what I was shooting for. Once I got the tone down, then I went through the plot. The market's movements provided you with an underlying plot. You make your short deal, then the bank is trying to squeeze you out, and then it all breaks loose. So that was pretty easy, and it provided character arcs against that." Two years after Randolph wrote his draft, McKay, as director, rewrote Randolph's screenplay. It was McKay's idea to include the celebrity cameos in the film to explain the financial concepts.

=== Casting ===
On January 13, 2015, Variety reported that Brad Pitt, Christian Bale, and Ryan Gosling were set to star in the film, with Pitt producing the film along with Dede Gardner and Jeremy Kleiner. Plan B Entertainment would produce, with Paramount handling the distribution rights. Before this, Pitt had already starred in the adaptation of the author's Moneyball, for which he was nominated for an Oscar. On January 14, it was announced that Steve Carell would also star. On April 21, 2015, more cast was revealed by Deadline, including Melissa Leo, Marisa Tomei, Tracy Letts, Hamish Linklater, John Magaro, Byron Mann, Rafe Spall, Jeremy Strong, and Finn Wittrock. Max Greenfield joined the ensemble cast of the film on April 23, 2015. Karen Gillan tweeted about her involvement in the film on May 8, 2015. Jeffry Griffin, who plays Vennett's assistant Chris, was originally planned to appear only as an extra and was cast to a speaking role after a production assistant picked him out of a crowd.

=== Filming ===
Principal photography on the film began on March 18, 2015, in New Orleans, Louisiana. On March 25, filming was taking place on General de Gaulle Boulevard in the Algiers section of New Orleans. On May 8, Gillan confirmed she was shooting her scenes. On May 20, filming took place on a short stretch of Mercer Street, between Prince Street and Spring Street, in Manhattan, New York City. On May 22, the production crew recreated the offices of failed investment firm Lehman Brothers in the lobby of the New York State Department of Financial Services in Manhattan.

== Release ==
On September 22, 2015, Paramount set the film for a limited release on December 11, 2015, and a wide release on December 23, 2015. The film was rated R by the Motion Picture Association (MPA, formerly MPAA) for pervasive language and some sexuality/nudity. The film was released on DVD and Blu-ray on March 15, 2016.

== Box office ==
The Big Short grossed $70.3 million in the United States and Canada and $63.2 million in other countries for a worldwide total of $133.4 million, against a production budget of $50 million.

The film was released in eight theaters in Los Angeles, New York, San Francisco and Chicago on December 11, 2015, and earned $705,527 (an average of $88,191 per theater). It set the record for the best ever per-screen gross for a film opening in eight locations, breaking the previous record held by Memoirs of a Geisha ($85,313 per theater), and was the third biggest theater average of 2015 behind the four screen debuts of Steve Jobs ($130,000) and The Revenant ($118,640).

The film had its wide release on December 23, 2015, and grossed $2.3 million on its first day. In its opening weekend it grossed $10.5 million, finishing 6th at the box office.

== Reception ==
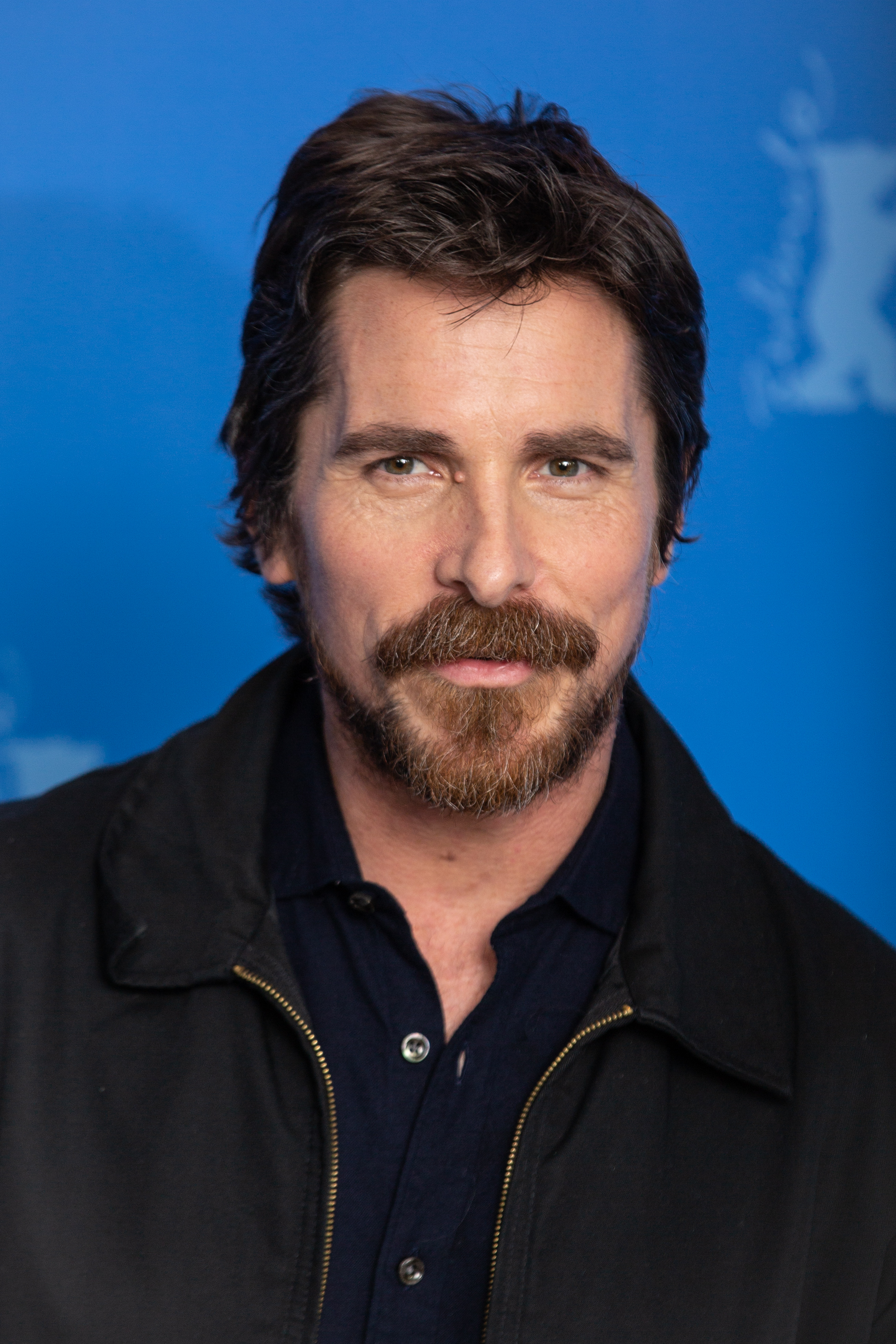
Christian Bale received widespread acclaim, earning an Academy Award for Best Supporting Actor nomination

On review aggregator website Rotten Tomatoes, The Big Short has an approval rating of 89% based on 331 reviews, with an average rating of 7.8/10. The site's critical consensus reads, "The Big Short approaches a serious, complicated subject with an impressive attention to detail – and manages to deliver a well-acted, scathingly funny indictment of its real-life villains in the bargain." On Metacritic, the film has a score of 81 out of 100 based on 45 reviews, indicating "universal acclaim". Audiences polled by CinemaScore gave the film an average grade of "A−" on an A+ to F scale.

IGN gave the film a score of 8.6/10, praising its "energetic direction" and making "a complicated tale palpable for the layperson even as it triggers outrage at the fatcats who helped cause it".

The New York Times' "UpShot" series stated The Big Short offered the "strongest film explanation of the global financial crisis". The series also stated that it "wouldn't necessarily have been able to cash in as successfully as the characters in The Big Short. The success of this film is due to the work of the actors who played the characters."

In 2021, members of Writers Guild of America West (WGAW) and Writers Guild of America, East (WGAE) voted its screenplay 55th in WGA’s 101 Greatest Screenplays of the 21st Century (So Far). In 2025, it was one of the films voted for the "Readers' Choice" edition of The New York Times' list of "The 100 Best Movies of the 21st Century," finishing at number 133.

=== Historical accuracy ===
David McCandless's visual blog Information is Beautiful deduced that, while taking creative license into account, the film was 91.4% accurate when compared to real-life events, calling it a "shockingly truthful film" with "very little dramatization or fakery."

Movie critics with backgrounds in finance also commented on the film. Many agreed with the public that The Big Short was entertaining and engaging, but also terrifying. Glenn Kenny reported the film accurately got the message across how even though the lives of the characters were not interconnected, their stories were. The film's epilogue echoes professional comments on the wake of the 2008 collapse: "while profits ran high, the demands for regulation and oversight were minimal and disregarded in pursuit of ever-increasing returns."

While the general plot of the film is the same as the book, many of the character names have been changed. For example, Steve Eisman has become "Mark Baum" and Greg Lippmann has become "Jared Vennett". Some biographical information has also been slightly modified.

Meredith Whitney's story was featured prominently in Lewis's book based on her highly pessimistic 2007-08 analysis of banks in general and Citigroup in particular (her report on Citi led to the CEO's resignation and the stock dropping over 90%). Yet Whitney's narrative was entirely omitted from the film, drawing criticism from The Washington Post.

Eisman said he respects Carell's portrayal but also added it was not entirely accurate in reflecting his real character. Speaking to The Globe and Mail in 2016, Eisman said, "Eliminate my sense of humor and make me angry all the time, and that's [Carell's] portrayal. It's accurate enough, but it's not really me.". However, in a September 2025 post to his YouTube channel discussing which movie scenes were most accurate and which featured creative license, Eisman recalled how after reading the transcript of his interview with the Financial Crisis Inquiry Commission from 2010, he reassessed Carell's portrayal: "I read my whole transcript, my entire interview... You know, Steve Carell was right. I was that angry. I was so angry at what Wall Street had done."

In 2016, Reason Magazine wrote a review affirming the accuracy of the ensuing government bailouts stating, "these banks acted knowing Uncle Sam would bail them out if their bets went bad. Downside risk is meaningless when someone else takes the loss."

The film, along with The Wolf of Wall Street, had a brief resurgence in the wake of the January 2021 GameStop short squeeze as the events shown in the films provided reference points for what was happening with the GameStop and related stocks.

== Accolades ==
Adam McKay and Charles Randolph won the Academy Award, BAFTA Award, Critics' Choice Movie Award, and Writers Guild of America Award, all for Best Adapted Screenplay. They also won an Empire Award for Best Screenplay. Christian Bale won the Critics' Choice Movie Award for Best Actor in a Comedy and the Satellite Award for Best Supporting Actor - Motion Picture. Hank Corwin won the American Cinema Editors Award for Best Edited Feature Film (Comedy or Musical) and Los Angeles Film Critics Association Award for Best Editing.

The film won the Critics' Choice Movie Award for Best Comedy and was named one of the Top 10 Films of the Year at the American Film Institute Awards 2015. Dede Gardner, Jeremy Kleiner, and Brad Pitt won the Producers Guild of America Award for Best Theatrical Motion Picture. The cast also won the National Board of Review Award for Best Ensemble.

== See also ==
- Bankruptcy of Lehman Brothers
- The Last Days of Lehman Brothers
- Great Recession
- Inside Job (2010 film)
- Margin Call (2011 film)
- Too Big to Fail (film)
