= Credit rating agencies and the subprime crisis =

Credit rating agencies (CRAs), firms which rate debt instruments/securities according to the debtor's ability to pay lenders back, played a significant role at various stages in the American subprime mortgage crisis of 2007–2008 that led to the 2008 financial crisis and the Great Recession of 2008–2009. The new, complex securities of "structured finance" used to finance subprime mortgages could not have been sold without ratings by the "Big Three" rating agencies—Moody's Investors Service, Standard & Poor's, and Fitch Ratings. A large section of the debt securities market—many money markets and pension funds—were restricted in their bylaws to holding only the safest securities—i.e. securities the rating agencies designated "triple-A".

The pools of debt the agencies gave their highest ratings to included over three trillion dollars of loans to homebuyers with bad credit and undocumented incomes through 2007. Hundreds of billions of dollars' worth of these triple-A securities were downgraded to "junk" status by 2010, and the writedowns and losses came to over half a trillion dollars.

This led "to the collapse or disappearance" in 2008–09 of three major investment banks (Bear Stearns, Lehman Brothers, and Merrill Lynch), and the federal government's buying of $700 billion of bad debt from distressed financial institutions.

== Impact on the crisis ==
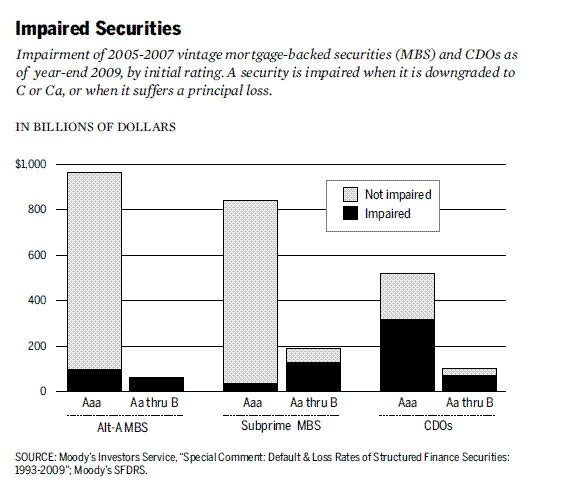
source: Final Report of the National Commission on the Causes of the Financial and Economic Crisis in the United States, p.229, figure 11.4

Credit rating agencies came under scrutiny following the mortgage crisis for giving investment-grade, "money safe" ratings to securitized mortgages (in the form of securities known as mortgage-backed securities (MBS) and collateralized debt obligations (CDO)) based on "non-prime"—subprime or Alt-A—mortgages loans.

Demand for the securities was stimulated by the large global pool of fixed income investments which had doubled from $36 trillion in 2000 to $70 trillion by 2006—more than annual global spending—and the low interest rates from competing fixed income securities, made possible by the low interest rate policy of the U.S. Federal Reserve Bank for much of that period. These high ratings encouraged the flow of global investor funds into these securities funding the housing bubble in the US.

=== Mortgage-related securities ===
Ratings were/are vital to "private-label" asset-backed securities—such as subprime mortgage-backed securities (MBS), and collateralized debt obligations (CDO), "CDOs squared", and "synthetic CDOs"—whose "financial engineering" make them "harder to understand and to price than individual loans".

Earlier traditional and more simple "prime" mortgage securities were issued and guaranteed by Fannie Mae and Freddie Mac—"enterprises" sponsored by the Federal government. Their safety wasn't questioned by conservative money managers. Non-prime private label mortgage securities were neither made up of loans to borrowers with high credit ratings nor insured by a government enterprise, so issuers used an innovation in securities structure to get higher agency ratings. They pooled debt and then "sliced" the result into "tranches", each with a different priority in the debt repayment stream of income. The most "senior" tranches highest up in priority of revenue—which usually made up most of the pool of debt—received the triple A ratings. This made them eligible for purchase by the pension funds and money market funds restricted to top-rated debt, and for use by banks wanting to reduce costly capital requirements under Basel II.

The complexity of analyzing the debt pool mortgages and tranche priority, and the position of the Big Three credit rating agencies "between the issuers and the investors of securities", is what "transformed" the agencies into "key" players in the process, according to the Financial Crisis Inquiry Report. "Participants in the securitization industry realized that they needed to secure favorable credit ratings in order to sell structured products to investors. Investment banks therefore paid handsome fees to the rating agencies to obtain the desired ratings."

According to the CEO of a servicer of the securitization industry, Jim Callahan of PentAlpha, "The rating agencies were important tools to do that because you know the people that we were selling these bonds to had never really had any history in the mortgage business. ... They were looking for an independent party to develop an opinion,"

From 2000 to 2007, Moody's rated nearly 45,000 mortgage-related securities—more than half of those it rated—as triple-A. In contrast only six (private sector) companies in the United States were given that top rating.

By December 2008, there were over $11 trillion structured finance securities outstanding in the US bond market debt.

==== CDOs ====
Rating agencies were even more important in disposing of the MBS tranches that could not be rated triple A. Although these made up a minority of the value of the MBS tranches, unless buyers were found for them, it would not be profitable to make the security in the first place. And because traditional mortgage investors were risk-averse (often because of SEC regulations or restrictions in their charters), these less-safe tranches were the most difficult to sell.

To sell these "mezzanine" tranches, investment bankers pooled them to form another security—known as a collateralized debt obligation (CDO). Though the raw material of these "obligations" was made up of BBB, A−, etc. tranches, the CRAs rated 70% to 80% of the new CDO tranches triple A. The 20–30% remaining mezzanine tranches were usually bought up by other CDOs, to make so-called "CDO-Squared" securities which also produced tranches rated mostly triple A by rating agencies. This process was disparaged as a way of transforming "dross into gold" or "ratings laundering" by at least some business journalists.

Trust in rating agencies was particularly important for CDOs for another reason—their contents were subject to change, so CDO managers "didn't always have to disclose what the securities contained". This lack of transparency did not affect demand for the securities. Investors "weren't so much buying a security" as they "were buying a triple-A rating", according to business journalists Bethany McLean and Joe Nocera.

Still another structured product was the "synthetic CDO". Cheaper and easier to create than original "cash" CDOs, these securities did not provide funding for housing. Instead synthetic CDO-buying investors were in effect providing insurance (in the form of "credit default swaps") against mortgage default. Synthetics "referenced" cash CDOs, and rather than providing investors with interest and principal payments from MBS tranches, they paid insurance premium-like payments from credit default swap "insurance". If the referenced CDOs defaulted, investors lost their investment, which was paid out as insurance. Because synthetics referenced another (cash) CDO, more than one—in fact numerous—synthetics could be made to reference the same original. This multiplied the effect if a referenced security defaulted.

Here again the giving of triple-A ratings to "large chunks" of synthetics by the rating agencies was crucial to the securities' success. The buyer of synthetic tranches (who often went on to lose his investment) was seldom an analyst "who had investigated the mortgage-backed security", was aware of deteriorating mortgage underwriting standards, or that the payments they would receive were often coming from investors betting against mortgage-backed security solvency. Rather, "it was someone who was buying a rating and thought he couldn't lose money."

=== Downgrades and writedowns ===
By the end of 2009, over half of the collateralized debt obligations by value issued at the end of the housing bubble (from 2005–2007) that rating agencies gave their highest "triple-A" rating to, were "impaired"—that is either written-down to "junk" or suffered a "principal loss" (i.e. not only had they not paid interest but investors would not get back some of the principal they invested). The Financial Crisis Inquiry Commission estimates that by April 2010, of all mortgage-backed securities Moody's had rated triple-A in 2006, 73% were downgraded to junk.

Mortgage underwriting standards deteriorated to the point that between 2002 and 2007 an estimated $3.2 trillion in loans were made to homeowners with bad credit and undocumented incomes (e.g., subprime or Alt-A mortgages) and bundled into MBSs and collateralized debt obligations that received high ratings and therefore could be sold to global investors. Higher ratings were believed justified by various credit enhancements including over-collateralization (i.e., pledging collateral in excess of debt issued), credit default insurance, and equity investors willing to bear the first losses. But as of September 2008, bank writedowns and losses on these investments totaled $523 billion.

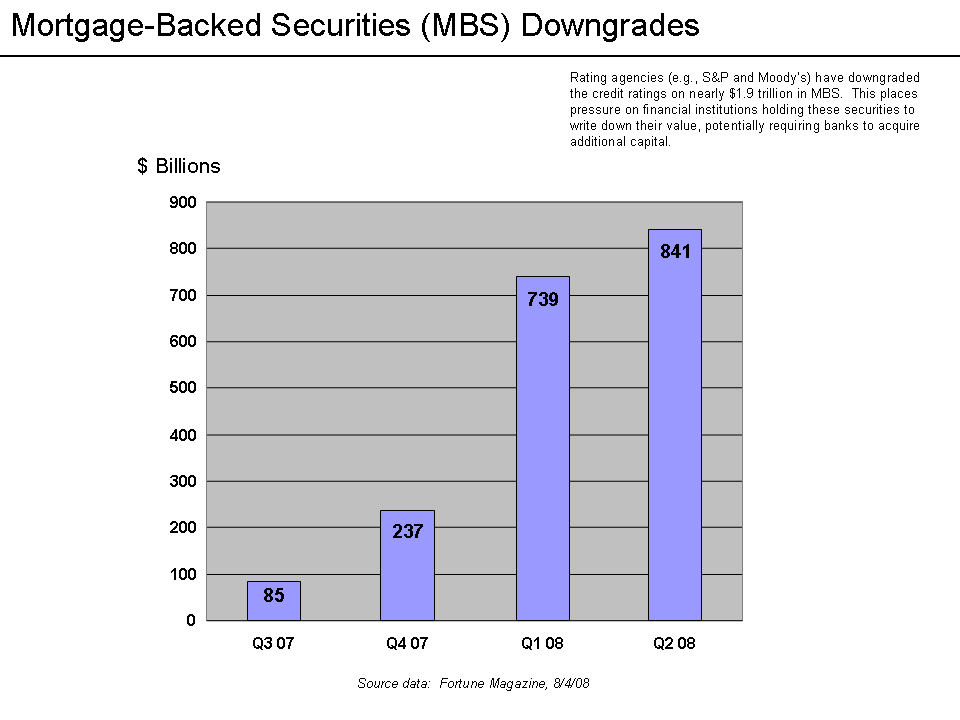
MBS Credit Rating Downgrades, By Quarter

Rating agencies lowered the credit ratings on $1.9 trillion in mortgage backed securities from the third fiscal quarter (1 July—30 September) of 2007 to the second quarter (1 April–30 June) of 2008. One institution, Merrill Lynch, sold more than $30 billion of collateralized debt obligations for 22 cents on the dollar in late July 2008.

The net worth of financial institutions owning the newly downgraded securities declined, requiring the institutions to acquire additional capital, to maintain capital ratios, which in turn often lowered the net-worth value of the institutions above and beyond the low of value of the downgraded securities. Adding to the financial chain reaction were regulations—governmental or internal—requiring some institutional investors to carry only investment-grade (e.g., "BBB" and better) assets. A downgrade below that meant forced asset sales and further devaluation.

== Criticism ==
During the 2008 financial crisis, the rating agencies came under criticism from investigators, economists, and journalists. The Financial Crisis Inquiry Commission (FCIC) set up by the U.S. Congress and president to investigate the causes of the crisis, and publisher of the Financial Crisis Inquiry Report (FCIR), concluded that the "failures" of the Big Three rating agencies were "essential cogs in the wheel of financial destruction" and "key enablers of the financial meltdown". It went on to say

The mortgage-related securities at the heart of the crisis could not have been marketed and sold without their seal of approval. Investors relied on them, often blindly. In some cases, they were obligated to use them, or regulatory capital standards were hinged on them. This crisis could not have happened without the rating agencies. Their ratings helped the market soar and their downgrades through 2007 and 2008 wreaked havoc across markets and firms."

U.S. Securities and Exchange Commission Commissioner Kathleen Casey complained the ratings of the large rating agencies were "catastrophically misleading", yet the agencies "enjoyed their most profitable years ever during the past decade" while doing so. The Economist magazine opined that "it is beyond argument that ratings agencies did a horrendous job evaluating mortgage-tied securities before the financial crisis hit."

Economist Joseph Stiglitz considered "the rating agencies as one of the key culprits... They were the party that performed the alchemy that converted the securities from F-rated to A-rated. The banks could not have done what they did without the complicity of the rating agencies." In their book on the crisis—All the Devils Are Here—journalists Bethany McLean and Joe Nocera criticized rating agencies for continuing "to slap their triple-A [ratings]s on subprime securities even as the underwriting deteriorated—and as the housing boom turned into an outright bubble" in 2005, 2006, 2007.

=== Legal actions ===
Dozens of suits involving claims of inaccurate ratings were filed against the rating agencies by investors. Plaintiffs have included by collateralized debt obligation investors (the state of Ohio for losses of $457 million, California state employees for $1 billion), the bankrupt investment bank Bear Stearns (for losses of $1.12 billion from alleged "fraudulently issuing inflated ratings for securities"), bond insurers. The U.S. Government is also a plaintiff (suing S&P for $5 billion for "misrepresenting the credit risk of complex financial products").

=== SEC actions ===
On 11 June 2008 the U.S. Securities and Exchange Commission proposed far-reaching rules designed to address perceived conflicts of interest between rating agencies and issuers of structured securities. The proposal would, among other things, prohibit a credit rating agency from issuing a rating on a structured product unless information on assets underlying the product was available, prohibit credit rating agencies from structuring the same products that they rate, and require the public disclosure of the information a credit rating agency uses to determine a rating on a structured product, including information on the underlying assets. The last proposed requirement is designed to facilitate "unsolicited" ratings of structured securities by rating agencies not compensated by issuers.

On 3 December 2008, the SEC approved measures to strengthen oversight of credit rating agencies, following a ten-month investigation that found "significant weaknesses in ratings practices," including conflicts of interest.

== Explanations for inaccurate ratings ==
The FCIC commission found that agencies' credit ratings were influenced by "flawed computer models, the pressure from financial firms that paid for the ratings, the relentless drive for market share, the lack of resources to do the job despite record profits, and the absence of meaningful public oversight." McLean and Nocera blame credit ratings lapses on "an erosion of standards, a willful suspension of skepticism, a hunger for big fees and market share, and an inability to stand up to" the investment banks issuing the securities.

=== Competitive pressure to lower standards ===
Structured investment mortgage-related securities were the rating agencies' "golden goose". They earned close to three times as much grading these instruments, compared to corporate bonds, their traditional business. In addition, credit rating agencies earned $300,000–500,000, and in some cases $1 million, to set up a structured investment vehicle. By 2007, the rating business accounted for just under half of the total revenue and the entire revenue growth for Moody's, one of the largest agencies, came from subprime products. Issuers of subprime debt 'shopped' around to find the best ratings from major agencies.

Richard Michalek, a former Vice President and Senior Credit Officer at Moody's, testified before the Financial Crisis Inquiry Commission (FCIC) that, even when such threats were not carried out, "The threat of losing business to a competitor ... absolutely tilted the balance away from an independent arbiter of risk." When asked whether investment banks frequently threatened to withdraw their business if they did not receive the ratings they wanted, former Moody's Managing Director Gary Witt told the FCIC:

“Oh God, are you kidding? All the time. I mean, that's routine. I mean, they would threaten you all of the time. . . . It's like, ‘Well, next time, we're just going to go with Fitch and S&P.'”

At Standard & Poor's rating service one subpoenaed email sent by a security-issuing banker angry over possible revision of residential mortgage-backed security ratings, told an analyst: "Heard your ratings could be 5 notches back of moddys [sic] equivalent, Gonna kill you resi biz. May force us to do moddyfitch [S&P competitors Moody's and Fitch Rating] only ..."

Another email between colleagues at Standard & Poor's written before the bubble burst, suggests awareness of what would happen to the securities they were giving top ratings to: "Rating agencies continue to create and [sic] even bigger monster--the CDO market. Let's hope we are all wealthy and retired by the time this house of cards falters."

=== Conflicts of interest ===
Critics have claimed there was a conflict of interest for agencies—a conflict between accommodating clients for whom higher ratings of debt mean higher earnings, and accurately rating the debt for the benefit of the debt buyer/investor customers, who provide no revenue to the agencies. Being a publicly traded firm intensifies the pressure to grow and increase profits. Of the two biggest agencies Moody's became a public firm in 2001, while Standard & Poor's is part of the publicly traded McGraw-Hill Companies.

One study of "6,500 structured debt ratings" produced by Standard & Poor's, Moody's and Fitch, found ratings by agencies "biased in favour of issuer clients that provide the agencies with more rating business. This result points to a powerful conflict of interest, which goes beyond the occasional disagreement among employees."

=== Unwillingness to spend on human resources ===
While Moody's and other credit rating agencies were quite profitable—Moody's operating margins were consistently over 50%, higher than famously successful Exxon Mobil or Microsoft, and its stock rose 340% between the time it was spun off into a public company and February 2007—salaries and bonuses for non-management were low by Wall Street standards and its employees complained of overwork.

According to journalists McLean and Nocera, "The analysts in structured finance were working 12 to 15 hours a day. They made a fraction of the pay of even a junior investment banker. There were far more deals in the pipeline than they could possibly handle. They were overwhelmed. Moody's top brass ... wouldn't add staff because they didn't want to be stuck with the cost of employees if the revenues slowed down."

Moody's Team manager Gary Witt complained that "penny-pinching" and "stingy" management was reluctant to pay up for experienced employees. "The problem of recruiting and retaining good staff was insoluble. Investment banks often hired away our best people. As far as I can remember, we were never allocated funds to make counter offers. We had almost no ability to do meaningful research." When asked about this by the FCIC, Moody's president Brian Clarkson admitted that investment banks paid more than his agency so retaining employees was "a challenge".

=== Manipulation of ratings ===
Journalist Michael Lewis argues that the low pay of credit rating agency employees allowed security issuers to game the ratings of their securities. Lewis quotes one Goldman Sachs "trader-turned hedge fund manager" telling him, "guys who can't get a job on Wall Street get a job at Moody's," as Moody's paid much less. This was despite the fact that a job at Moody's—or any of the other rating agencies—gave an analyst the power to upgrade or downgrade a security, whereas the higher paid analysts' recommendations at Wall Street investment banks had no such impact on the market. However, the difference in pay meant that the "smartest" analysts at the credit rating agencies "leave for Wall Street firms where they could use their knowledge (of criteria used to rate securities) to manipulate the companies they used to work for." Consequently, it was widely known on Wall Street that the "inner workings" of the rating models used by the credit rating agencies, while "officially, a secret", "were ripe for exploitation." At least one other investment firm that bet against the agencies' credit ratings with huge success believed "there was a massive amount of gaming going on."

When asked by the FCIC Commission about "the high turnover" and "revolving door that often left raters dealing with their old colleagues, this time as clients", Moody's officials stated their employees were prohibited from rating deals by a bank or issuer while they were interviewing for a job with that particular institution, but notifying management of any such interview was the responsibility of the employee. After getting a job at an investment bank, former employees were barred from interacting with Moody's on "the same series of deals they had rated while in its employ", but not on any other deals with Moody's.

==== Ways of "gaming" ====
According to the hedge fund managers Michael Lewis talked to who had bet against mortgages securities, there were a number of ways to game or "reverse-engineer" the raters' models.

Rating agencies judged creditworthiness of a pool of loans in part by looking at the averages of credit scores of borrowers who made up the security. The agencies used FICO, the "best-known and most widely used credit score model". The average FICO score needed to be about 615 for a pool of loans to meet rating agencies' minimum standard and allow a maximum percentage of triple-A rated tranches.

While using an average was less work than getting a list of the borrowers' individual scores or finding the standard deviation of the pool of scores, it left out useful information. A pool of loans composed of borrowers all of whom had a FICO score of 615 was likely far fewer defaults than a pool of loans with the same average but more dispersion—e.g.composed of borrowers half of whom had FICO scores of 550 and half 680, since someone who had earned a FICO score as low as 550 "was virtually certain to default". Knowing this blind spot, securities issuers who could no longer find high-FICO-scoring families who wanted to take out a mortgage found other ways to raise the average pool score.

One way was to convince immigrants to buy homes. People who had not been in the country long, often had "never failed to repay a debt, because they had never been given a loan". Such people had surprisingly high FICO scores if you ignored the short credit history or "thin file". Rating agencies did, and FICO scores ignored and personal or household income. Thus did low income immigrants increase the percentage of pool of loans that could be declared triple-A" and explain otherwise unlikely sounding press reports of a "Mexican strawberry picker with an income of $14,000 and no English" being "lent every penny he needed to buy a house of $724,000".

Other "opportunities" for issuers manipulating credit raters included

- Moody's and S&P favoring of "floating-rate mortgages with low teaser rates over fixed-rate" mortgages;
- their lack of interest in whether "a loan had been made in a booming real estate market or a quiet one";
- whether a lender had a 'silent second', i.e. an undisclosed second mortgages that left the homeowner with no equity in his home and thus no financial incentive not abandon it if real estate prices declined; and
- "the fraud implicit in no doc loans".

"The models used by the rating agencies were riddled with these sorts of opportunities", according to Lewis. "The trick was finding them" before other security issuers did.

== Aftermath ==
In 2006, the Credit Rating Agency Reform Act was passed, intending to break the dominance of the "big three" agencies—Standard & Poor's, Moody's, and Fitch—by making it easier to qualify as a "nationally recognized" ratings agency.

However, in 2013, McClatchy Newspapers found that "little competition has emerged in rating the kinds of complex home-mortgage securities whose implosion led to the 2007 financial crisis". In the 12 months that ended in June 2011, the SEC reported that the big three issued 97% of all credit ratings, down only 1% from 98% in 2007. Critics have complained that the criteria to designate a rating agency as "a nationally recognized statistical rating organization" was written by a "yet-to-be-identified official of one of the big three ratings agencies", and is so difficult that it has "prevented at least one potential competitor from winning approval and have dissuaded others from even applying". Former Federal Reserve chairman Paul Volcker complained in a September 2013 article on banking and the shortcoming of post-crisis financial reform, that "no meaningful reform of the credit-rating agencies has been undertaken". In the spring of 2013, Moody's and Standard & Poor's settled two "long-running" lawsuits "seeking to hold them responsible for misleading investors about the safety of risky debt vehicles that they had rated". The suits were filed in 2008 and had sought more than $700 million of damages. Settlement terms were not disclosed in both cases, and the lawsuits were dismissed "with prejudice", meaning they cannot be brought again. Other lawsuits are still outstanding as of September 2013.

In the dozens of suits filed against them by investors involving claims of inaccurate ratings the rating agencies have defended themselves using a First Amendment defense (based on the precedent of New York Times Co. v. Sullivan). This maintains a credit rating is an opinion protected as free speech and requires plaintiffs to prove actual malice by the agency However, some wonder if the defense will ultimately prevail.

According to columnist Floyd Norris at least one rating agency—S&P—responded to the credit crisis by first tightening up its standards and sacrificing market share to restore its reputation, after which it loosened standards again "to get more business", tripling its market share in the first half of 2013. This is because, according to Norris, for rating franchises to be worth anything, they must seem to be credible to investors. But once they overcome that minimal hurdle, they will get more business if they are less critical than their competitors.
