= Credit derivatives product company =

A Credit Derivatives Product Company (CDPC) is a business focused on trading in credit default swaps contracts. CDPC typically sells insurance against someone failing to pay back a loan ('defaulting'). A CDPC is usually highly leveraged, meaning that if even a portion of its held credit default portfolio were to be 'triggered' at once, the CDPC would not have the capital to fully pay out the resulting insurance claims.

The CDPC business model is dependent on a triple-A rating from a credit rating agency and must trade within closely defined limitations to be allowed to maintain their credit rating.

== History ==
The first CDPC was Primus Financial Products, launched in 2002. In October 2008 Fitch Ratings withdrew its ratings on all five CDPCs that it had previously rated, citing in part "the uncertain business prospects for CDPCs".

== List of CDPCs ==
Name	Established	Sponsors, Investors, related parties	CEO	Refs
Primus Financial Products	2002		Tom Jasper	
Aladdin Financial Products	2007	Aladdin Capital Holdings	Isaac Efrat	
Athilon Structured Investment Advisors	2004 Dec	Lightyear Capital	Pat Gonzales	
Cournot Financial Products		Morgan Stanley	Frank Iacono	
Invicta Capital	2007 Jan	Babson Capital, MassMutual	Steve Kahn	
Quadrant Structured Credit Products	2007 Oct	Magnetar Capital, Lehman Brothers	Gene Park	
Pallium Investment Management		Bank of Montreal, others		
NewLands	2007/2008	DeutscheBank, AXA		
Structured Credit Holdings	2006 June	Aquiline, CalPERS, CDPQ, Calyon, Triad, ex-employees of Radian Asset Assurance		
Bear Stearns Asset Management				
Channel Capital	Early 2007	Calyon, LBBW, Principia Partners (IT)		
Koch Financial Products				
Satago Financial Products				
Theta Corporation	December 2004	Gordian Knot Limited		
Deerfield Capital Management				
Harbor Road Financial Products		Tricadia Capital		

== See also ==
- Monoline insurers (also dependent on a AAA rating, also sold credit default swaps)
