= The Big Short =

2010 book by Michael Lewis

The Big Short: Inside the Doomsday Machine
- Hardcover edition
- Author: Michael Lewis
- Language: English
- Genre: Financial thriller
- Publisher: W. W. Norton & Company
- Publication date: March 15, 2010
- Publication place: United States
- Media type: Print (hardcover)
- Pages: 320 pp.
- ISBN: 0-393-07223-1
- OCLC: 567188407
- LC Class: HC106.83 L5 2010
- Preceded by: Home Game
- Followed by: Boomerang

The Big Short: Inside the Doomsday Machine is a nonfiction book by Michael Lewis about the build-up of the United States housing bubble during the 2000s. It was released on March 15, 2010, by W. W. Norton & Company. It spent 28 weeks on The New York Times best-seller list, and was the basis for the 2015 film of the same name.

== Summary ==
The Big Short describes several of the main players in the creation of the credit default swap market who sought to bet against the collateralized debt obligation (CDO) bubble and thus ended up profiting from the 2008 financial crisis. It also highlights the eccentric natures of people who bet against the market or otherwise "go against the grain."

The book follows people who believed the housing bubble was going to burst—including Meredith Whitney, who predicted the demise of Citigroup and Bear Stearns; Steve Eisman, an outspoken hedge fund manager; Greg Lippmann, a Deutsche Bank trader; Eugene Xu, a quantitative analyst who created the first CDO market by matching buyers and sellers; the founders of Cornwall Capital, who started a hedge fund in their garage with $110,000 and built it into $120 million when the market crashed; and Michael Burry, an ex-neurologist who created Scion Capital.

It also highlights some of the people involved in the biggest losses in the market crash: Wing Chau, Merrill's $300 million mezzanine CDO manager; Howie Hubler, known as the person who lost $9 billion in one trade, the fifth-largest single loss in history; and Joseph Cassano's AIG Financial Products, which suffered more than $99 billion in losses.

== Reception ==
The Big Short was shortlisted for the 2010 Financial Times and Goldman Sachs Business Book of the Year Award. It spent 28 weeks on The New York Times' non-fiction bestseller list. It also received the 2011 Robert F. Kennedy Center for Justice and Human Rights Book Award.

== Film ==
Paramount acquired the rights to The Big Short: Inside the Doomsday Machine in 2013. On March 24, 2014, it was announced that Adam McKay would direct the adaptation. On January 13, 2015, Variety reported that Brad Pitt, Christian Bale and Ryan Gosling were set to star in the film, and that Pitt would produce it with McKay and Dede Gardner. Steve Carell then joined. Plan B Entertainment financed the film with Paramount handling the distribution rights.

Production started March 23, 2015 in New Orleans, LA. The film was released on December 11, 2015, and was met with critical acclaim, winning the Academy Award for Best Adapted Screenplay, and receiving a nomination for the Academy Award for Best Picture.

== See also ==
- CDO-Squared
- Collateralized debt obligation
- Credit default swap
- Mortgage-backed security
- The Greatest Trade Ever, a 2009 book by Gregory Zuckerman
- Too Big to Fail by Andrew Ross Sorkin
