= Synthetic CDO =

Financial product backed by premiums from credit default swaps

A synthetic CDO is a variation of a collateralized debt obligation (CDO) that generally uses credit default swaps (CDSs) and other derivatives to obtain its investment goals. As such, it is a complex derivative financial security sometimes described as a bet on the performance of other mortgage (or other) products, rather than a real mortgage security. The value and payment stream of a synthetic CDO is derived not from cash assets, like mortgages or credit card payments – as in the case of a regular or "cash" CDO—but from premiums paying for CDS "insurance" on the possibility of default of some defined set of "reference" securities—based on cash assets. The insurance-buying "counterparties" may own the "reference" securities and be managing the risk of their default, or may be speculators who've calculated that the securities will default.

A synthetic CDO is the opposite of a standard CDO in the following sense: investors in an ordinary CDO put up a principal to purchase the CDO's assets upfront and receive interest on their investment. In a synthetic CDO the investor is awarded a revenue stream upfront and only in the case of a credit default has to put up the principal, when their involvement in the synthetic CDO terminates.

Synthetics thrived for a brief time because they were cheaper and easier to create than traditional CDOs, whose raw material—mortgages—was beginning to dry up. In 2005, the synthetic CDO market in corporate bonds spread to the mortgage-backed securities market, where the counterparties providing the payment stream were primarily hedge funds or investment banks hedging, or often betting that certain debt the synthetic CDO referenced – usually "tranches" of subprime home mortgages – would default. Synthetic issuance jumped from $15 billion in 2005 to $61 billion in 2006, when synthetics became the dominant form of CDOs in the US, valued "notionally" at $5 trillion by the end of the year according to one estimate.

Synthetic CDOs are controversial because of their role in the subprime mortgage crisis. They enabled large wagers to be made on the value of mortgage-related securities, which critics argued may have contributed to lower lending standards and fraud.

Synthetic CDOs have been criticized for serving as a way of hiding short position of bets against the subprime mortgages from unsuspecting triple-A seeking investors, and contributing to the 2008 financial crisis by amplifying the subprime mortgage housing bubble. By 2012 the total notional value of synthetics had been reduced to a couple of billion dollars.

== History ==
In 1997, the Broad Index Secured Trust Offering (BISTRO) was introduced. It has been called the predecessor to the synthetic CDO structure. From 2005 through 2007, at least $108 billion in synthetic CDOs were issued, according to the financial data firm Dealogic. The actual volume was much higher because synthetic CDO trades are unregulated and "often not reported to any financial exchange or market". Journalist Gregory Zuckerman, states that "according to some estimates", while there "were $1.2 trillion of subprime loans" in 2006, "more than $5 trillion of investments", i.e. synthetic CDOs, were created based on these loans. Some of the major creators of synthetic CDOs who also took short positions in the securities were Goldman Sachs, Deutsche Bank, Morgan Stanley, and Tricadia Inc. In 2012, the total notional value of synthetic CDOs arranged was only about $2 billion.

== Definition ==
A synthetic CDO is typically negotiated between two or more counterparties that have different viewpoints about what will ultimately happen with respect to the underlying reference securities. In this regard, a synthetic CDO requires investors on both sides – those taking a long position and those taking a short position. Various financial intermediaries, such as investment banks and hedge funds, may be involved in finding the counterparties and selecting the reference securities on which exposures are to be taken. One counterparty typically pays a premium to another counterparty in exchange for a large payment if certain loss events related to the reference securities occur, similar to an insurance arrangement. These securities are not typically traded on stock exchanges.

In technical terms, the synthetic CDO is a form of collateralized debt obligation (CDO) in which the underlying credit exposures are taken using a credit default swap rather than by having a vehicle buy assets such as bonds. Synthetic CDOs can either be single-tranche CDOs or fully distributed CDOs. Synthetic CDOs are also commonly divided into balance sheet and arbitrage CDOs, although it is often impossible to distinguish in practice between the two types. They generate income selling insurance against bond defaults in the form of credit default swaps, typically on a pool of 100 or more companies. Sellers of credit default swaps receive regular payments from the buyers, which are usually banks or hedge funds.

== Parties ==
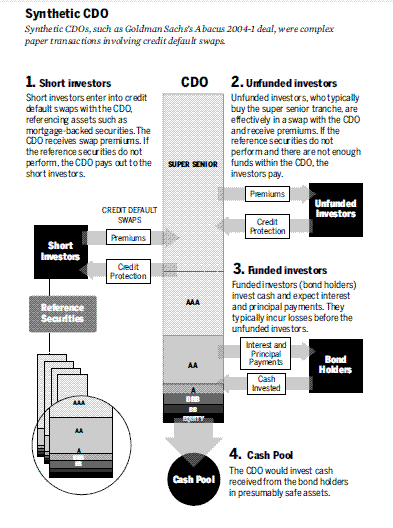
Synthetic CDO Diagram from Financial Crisis Inquiry Commission

Investors in synthetic CDOs included

- "funded" long investors, who paid cash to purchase actual securities issued by the referenced CDO. These investors received interest if the reference securities performed, but they could lose all of their investment if the reference securities defaulted.
- "unfunded" long investors, who entered into swaps with the synthetic CDO, making money if the reference securities performed. These investors were highest in the payment "waterfall" – receiving premium-like payments from the CDO as long as the reference securities performed – but they would have to pay if the reference securities deteriorated beyond a certain point and the CDO did not have sufficient funds to pay the short investors.
- "short" investors, who bought credit default swaps on the reference securities, making money if the securities failed. These investors were often hedge funds. They bought the credit default swaps from the CDOs and paid premiums unfunded investors received.

One example is Abacus 2004-1, the first of 47 synthetic CDOs Goldman Sachs packaged and sold. The deal was worth $2 billion. About one-third of the swaps referenced residential mortgage-backed securities, another third referenced existing CDOs, and the rest, commercial mortgage-backed securities (made up of bundled commercial real estate loans) and other securities.

The short investor for the entire deal – "betting it would fail" – was Goldman, which purchased credit default swap protection on the reference securities and paid premiums.

The funded investors of that CDO were IKB (a German bank), the TCW Group, and Wachovia. These firms put up a total of $195 million to purchase "mezzanine" tranches of the deal (rated AA to BB) and in return would receive scheduled principal and interest payments if the referenced assets performed. If those assets did not, Goldman would receive the $195 million. In this sense, IKB, TCW, and Wachovia were “long” investors, betting that the referenced assets would perform well.

The unfunded investors – TCW and GSC Partners (asset management firms that managed both hedge funds and CDOs) – did not put up any money up front; they received annual premiums from Goldman via the CDO in return for the promise that they would pay the CDO if the reference securities failed and the CDO did not have enough funds to pay the short investors. (As of 2011, Goldman, the CDO creator and short investor has received about $930 million, while the long investors lost "just about all of their investments".)

== Characteristics ==
A synthetic CDO is a tranche or tranches on a portfolio of credit default swaps (CDS). The portfolio could either consist of an index of reference securities, such as the CDX or iTraxx indices, or could be a bespoke portfolio, consisting of a list of reference obligations or reference entities selected by or specifically for a particular investor. Bespoke portfolios were more popular in Europe than in North America, and thus acquired the British term "bespoke", implying a suit tailored for a specific customer by a London Savile Row tailor.

A single-name CDS references only one security and the credit risk to be transferred in the swap may be very large. In contrast, a synthetic CDO references a portfolio of securities and is sliced into various tranches of risk, with progressively higher levels of risk. In turn, synthetic CDOs give buyers the flexibility to take on only as much credit risk as they wish to assume.

The seller of the synthetic CDO gets premiums for the component CDS and is taking the "long" position, meaning they are betting the referenced securities (such as mortgage bonds or regular CDOs) will perform. The buyers of the component CDS are paying premiums and taking the "short" position, meaning they are betting the referenced securities will default. The buyer receives a large payout if the referenced securities default, which is paid to them by the seller. The buyers of the synthetic CDO are taking a long position in the component CDS pool, as if the referenced securities default the seller of the synthetic CDO must pay out to the buyers of the component CDS rather than the buyers of the synthetic CDO.

The term synthetic CDO arises because the cash flows from the premiums (via the component CDS in the portfolio) are analogous to the cash flows arising from mortgage or other obligations that are aggregated and paid to regular CDO buyers. In other words, taking the long position on a synthetic CDO (i.e., receiving regular premium payments) is like taking the long position on a normal CDO (i.e., receiving regular interest payments on mortgage bonds or credit card bonds contained within the CDO).

In the event of default, those in the long position on either CDO or synthetic CDO suffer large losses. With the synthetic CDO, the long investor pays the short investor, versus the normal CDO in which the interest payments decline or stop flowing to the long investor.

Synthetic CDO Example: Party A wants to bet that at least some mortgage bonds and CDOs will default from among a specified population of such securities, taking the short position. Party B can bundle CDS related to these securities into a synthetic CDO contract. Party C agrees to take the long position, agreeing to pay Party A if certain defaults or other credit events occur within that population. Party A pays Party C premiums for this protection. Party B, typically an investment bank, would take a fee for arranging the deal.

One investment bank described a synthetic CDO as having

characteristics much like that of a futures contract, requiring two counterparties to take different views on the forward direction of a market or particular financial product, one short and one long. A CDO is a debt security collateralized by debt obligations, including mortgage-backed securities in many instances. These securities are packaged and held by a special purpose vehicle (SPV), which issues notes that entitle their holders to payments derived from the underlying assets. In a synthetic CDO, the SPV does not own the portfolio of actual fixed income assets that govern the investors’ rights to payment, but rather enters into CDSs that reference the performance of a portfolio. The SPV does hold some separate collateral securities which it uses to meet its payment obligations.

Another interesting characteristic of synthetic CDOs is that they are not usually fully funded like money market funds or other conventional investments. In other words, a synthetic CDO covering $1 billion of credit risk will not actually sell $1 billion in notes, but will raise some smaller amount. That is, only the most risky tranches are fully funded and the less risky tranches are not; after all, the entire point of structuring risk into tranches is that the less risky tranches are supposed to be inherently less likely to suffer default.

In the event of default on all the underlying obligations, the premiums paid by Party A to Party C in the above example would be paid back to Party A until exhausted. The next question is: who actually pays for the remaining credit risk on the less risky tranches, as well as the "super-senior" risk that was never structured into tranches at all (because it was thought that no properly structured synthetic CDO would actually undergo complete default). In reality, many banks simply kept the super-senior risk on their own books or insured it through severely undercapitalized "monoline" bond insurers. In turn, the growing mountains of super-senior risk caused major problems during the subprime mortgage crisis.

== Impact on the subprime mortgage crisis ==
According to New York Times business journalist Joe Nocera, synthetic CDOs expanded the impact of US mortgage defaults. Prior to the creation of CDS and synthetic CDOs, you could have only as much exposure to non-prime mortgage bonds as there were such mortgage bonds in existence. At their peak, approximately $1 trillion in subprime and Alt-A mortgages were securitized by Wall Street. However, with the introduction of the CDS and synthetic CDOs, exposure could be amplified since mortgage bonds could be "referenced" by an infinite number of synthetic CDOs, as long as investors agreed to take the other side of the bet. For example, the Financial Crisis Inquiry Commission Report found that more than $50 million in notional amount of credit default swaps in Synthetic CDOs referenced the low-rated BBB tranche of the one mortgage-backed security – "CMLTI 2006-NC2" – which had an initial principal amount of only $12 million. This was just one of many low-rated tranches referenced by multiple CDSs that later defaulted.

Synthetic CDOs were both "cheaper and easier" to create, easier to customize, and arranging them took a fraction of the time of that arranging cash flow CDOs. In 2006-2007 – as interest rates rose and home prices became increasingly unaffordable – subprime mortgage origination starting to run out of risky borrowers to make questionable home loans to, and at the same time the number of hedge funds and investment banks interested in betting with CDS (a raw material of synthetic CDOs) against repayment of the bad home loans grew.

== Debate and criticism ==
Synthetic CDOs have been strongly criticized for making the subprime mortgage crisis worse than it already was—or, as journalists Bethany McLean and Joe Nocera put it, turning a "keg of dynamite" that was subprime loans "into the financial equivalent of a nuclear bomb". Zuckerman calls the growth of synthetics, "the secret to why debilitating losses resulted from a market that seemed small to most outsiders".

Economist Paul Krugman and financier George Soros have called for their banning. Krugman wrote in April 2010 that: "What we can say is that the final draft of financial reform ... should block the creation of 'synthetic CDOs,' cocktails of credit default swaps that let investors take big bets on assets without actually owning them." Financier George Soros said in June 2009: "CDS are instruments of destruction which ought to be outlawed."

Author Roger Lowenstein wrote in April 2010:

... the collateralized debt obligations ... sponsored by most every Wall Street firm ... were simply a side bet – like those in a casino – that allowed speculators to increase society's mortgage wager without financing a single house ... even when these instruments are used by banks to hedge against potential defaults, they raise a moral hazard. Banks are less likely to scrutinize mortgages and other loans they make if they know they can reduce risk using swaps. The very ease with which derivatives allow each party to 'transfer' risk means that no one party worries as much about its own risk. But, irrespective of who is holding the hot potato when the music stops, the net result is a society with more risk overall.

He argued that speculative CDS should be banned and that more capital should be set aside by institutions to support their derivative activity.

Columnist Robert Samuelson wrote in April 2010 that the culture of investment banks has shifted from a focus on the most productive allocation of savings, to a focus on maximizing profit through proprietary trading and arranging casino-like wagers for market participants: "If buyers and sellers can be found, we'll create and trade almost anything, no matter how dubious. Precisely this mind-set justified the packaging of reckless and fraudulent "subprime" mortgages into securities. Hardly anyone examined the worth of the underlying loans."

Former Federal Reserve Chairman Paul Volcker has argued that banks should not be allowed to trade on their own accounts, essentially separating proprietary trading and financial intermediation entirely in separate firms, as opposed to separate divisions within firms. His recommendation – the Volcker Rule – would apply to synthetic securitization.

=== Specific issues ===
The Financial Crisis Inquiry Commission noted that while the credit default swaps used in synthetics were often compared to insurance, unlike insurance policies in the US they were not regulated. That meant that a party with no "insurable interest" could buy a credit default swap as a pure bet (known as "naked credit default swaps") – forbidden with insurance. This allowed inflation of potential losses or gains on the default of a loan or institution. Insurance regulators also required that

insurers put aside reserves in case of a loss. In the housing boom, CDS were sold by firms that failed to put up any reserves or initial collateral or to hedge their exposure. In the run-up to the crisis, AIG, the largest U.S. insurance company, would accumulate a one-half trillion dollar position in credit risk through the OTC market without being required to post one dollar's worth of initial collateral or making any other provision for loss.

The CDOs have also been described as serving as a way of hiding short position of bets against the subprime mortgages from investors who depended on credit rating agency ratings to judge risk. In the case of the Synthetic CDO Example provided above, there were a number of "Party Cs" who bought synthetic CDOs from investment banks, not because they had examined the referenced securities and thought a long position was prudent, but because they trusted the credit agency rating the investment bank had paid for. The investors were unaware that the investment bank had created the synthetic CDO because they – or a favored client such as Paulson & Co. – wanted to bet on the default of the referenced securities, and needed the investor to pay them off if they won. The New York Times quoted one expert as saying:

The simultaneous selling of securities to customers and shorting them because they believed they were going to default is the most cynical use of credit information that I have ever seen. ... When you buy protection against an event that you have a hand in causing, you are buying fire insurance on someone else’s house and then committing arson.

One bank spokesman said that synthetic CDOs created by Wall Street were made to satisfy client demand for such products, which the clients thought would produce profits because they had an optimistic view of the housing market.

The crisis has renewed debate regarding the duty of financial intermediaries or market-makers such as investment banks to their clients. Intermediaries frequently take long or short positions on securities. They will often assume the opposite side of a client's position to complete a transaction. The intermediary may hold or sell that position to increase, reduce or eliminate its own exposures. It is also typical that those clients taking the long or short positions do not know the identity of the other. The role of the intermediary is widely understood by the sophisticated investors that typically enter into complex transactions like synthetic CDOs.

However, when an intermediary is trading on its own account and not merely hedging financial exposures created in its market-maker role, potential conflicts of interest arise. For example, if an investment bank has a significant bet that a particular asset class will decline in value and has taken the short position, does it have a duty to reveal the nature of these bets to clients who are considering taking the long side of the bet? To what extent does a market-maker that also trades on its own account owe a fiduciary responsibility to its customers, if any?

== See also ==
- Collateralized debt obligation
- CDO-Squared
- Magnetar Capital
- Shelf corporation
- Special purpose entity
- Subprime mortgage crisis
- The Big Short
