= Magnetar Capital =

American hedge fund

Magnetar Capital LLC
- Type: Private
- Industry: Alternative Investment Management
- Founded: 2005; 21 years ago
- Founders: Alec Litowitz; Ross Laser
- Headquarters: Evanston, Illinois
- Key people: David Snyderman (Managing Partner); Ross Laser (president)
- Services: Investment management
- AUM: US$18.6 billion (2025)
- Number of employees: 260
- Website: www.magnetar.com

Magnetar Capital LLC is a multi-product, multi-strategy alternative asset management firm based in Evanston, Illinois. The firm was founded in 2005 and invests in alternative credit and fixed-income, quantitative investing, venture, and fundamental and event-driven investing strategies. Magnetar has additional offices in New York City, London, and Menlo Park.

The firm was actively involved in the collateralized debt obligation (CDO) market during the 2006–2007 period. In some articles critical of Magnetar Capital, the firm's arbitrage strategy for CDOs is described as the "Magnetar trade". While the CDOs Magnetar Capital helped create led to losses on Wall Street, the company profited as a result of its hedged investment strategy; Magnetar Capital had protected itself against losses on CDOs by purchasing credit default swaps. As of 2010, 23 of the CDOs in which Magnetar Capital invested had become "nearly worthless". Despite investigations by the U.S. Securities and Exchange Commission into several deals in which Magnetar Capital invested, no enforcement action was taken against the firm.

== History ==
Magnetar Capital was founded in 2005 by Alec Litowitz (formerly of Citadel LLC) and Ross Laser (formerly of Glenwood Capital Partners). Based in Evanston, Illinois, the firm started with $1.8 billion in capital, making it one of the largest hedge-fund launches at the time.

Since inception, the firm has invested across numerous strategies, but following the great financial crisis, Magnetar turned its focus to fixed income. Other strategies the firm has invested across include quantitative strategies, energy & infrastructure, and healthcare.

New York City-based Blackstone Group's hedge fund unit, Blackstone Alternative Asset Management, through its Strategic Capital Holdings Fund, bought a minority stake of Magnetar in 2015. Financials of the deal were not disclosed; Magnetar said the deal would help it expand, and management remained in place following the deal.

In 2022, David Snyderman succeeded co-founder Alec Litowitz as managing partner.

The firm's assets under management reached approximately $18.6 billion as of February 2025.

== Investment strategy ==
Magnetar Capital invests in alternative credit and fixed income, quantitative investing, venture, and fundamental and event-driven investing strategies.

=== Alternative Credit and Fixed Income ===
Magnetar's alternative credit and fixed income strategy includes specialty finance investments. This involves the ownership of financial assets, hard assets, and contractual cashflows or investing in debt instruments secured by these types of assets.

Magnetar has been investing in significant risk transfer (SRT) transactions for over 15 years. In 2023–2024, Magnetar executed 12 SRT deals totaling $724M across seven asset classes, earning the firm “Investor of the Year” at Structured Credit Investor's Capital Relief Trade awards.

=== Quantitative Investing ===
Magnetar's quantitative investing business attempts to capture return streams associated with traditional hedge fund strategies through rules-based, transparent and liquid strategies. Its current strategies include systematic risk arbitrage, systematic convertible arbitrage, and equity statistical arbitrage.

=== Ventures ===
In 2024, Magnetar launched its ventures business, which focuses on early- to growth-stage companies, largely in the AI and technology space. In addition to capital investments, Magnetar launched a dedicated fund in 2024 that provides companies with access to computing power through CoreWeave.

== Notable Investments ==
Magnetar became the largest equity holder in cloud computing provider CoreWeave, after investing $50 million in a convertible note issued by the company in 2021, leading the Series B round in 2023, participating in the company's series C funding round in 2024, and participating in a secondary share sale, also in 2024. That year, Magnetar was awarded mid-market “Growth Equity Deal of the Year” at the 15th Annual M&A Atlas Awards for its investments in CoreWeave. Magnetar was reported to be the largest beneficiary from CoreWeave's IPO in 2025.

=== Other investments include ===
- Dublin-based auto lender First Citizen
- UK solar assets, which were sold in 2018
- Film financing, including a $400 million co-financing deal with 20th Century Fox
- European real estate, including retail shopping centers in the UK in partnership with Northdale Asset Management
- Rental homes in Huber Heights, Ohio
- Double Eagle Energy Holdings III Permian in Texas
- Cohere, a large language model developer
- TensorWave, a provider of AMD-powered AI infrastructure solutions

== 2006–2007 involvement with CDOs ==
Magnetar Capital was actively involved in the CDO markets during the 2006–2007 period, when it invested in the equity of about $30 billion worth of them. CDO investments are divided into risk-based tranches: The highest-risk slices offer the highest yield, whereas the safer pieces have lower yields. Magnetar Capital took long positions in the highest risk slices of synthetic CDOs and hedged those positions by placing short bets on safer slices called mezzanine tranches via credit default swaps (which act similarly to an insurance policy) because Magnetar considered the former to be underpriced relative to the latter.

By establishing this arbitrage, Magnetar could profit from this relative mispricing regardless of how the overall housing market changed. When the market collapsed in 2007, Magnetar lost money on the riskiest slices it bought, but made much more from the hedges because of the relative mispricing that it had anticipated. According to mortgage analysts, Magnetar Capital would have benefitted from its "Magnetar trade," as it was later referred to, regardless of whether the subprime market collapsed.

ProPublica's coverage of the CDO industry, which won a Pulitzer Prize in 2011, made a number of allegations regarding Magnetar Capital's CDO investments, including that Magnetar Capital's trades in the CDO market helped worsen the 2008 financial crisis by helping to structure CDOs the company was planning to short (bet against). Other claims made by the ProPublica series include: Magnetar Capital tried to influence CDO managers to buy riskier bonds to increase the likelihood of those CDOs failing; CDOs that Magnetar Capital invested in "defaulted" at a much higher rate than similar CDOs; and the CDO market would have "cooled off" in late 2005 had Magnetar Capital not entered the market, resulting in a less severe financial crisis. ProPublica did note that in its view, while Magnetar Capital's CDOs might have prolonged and exacerbated the 2008 financial crisis, the firm did not cause the crisis or the housing bubble.

Contrary to the allegations, Magnetar Capital maintains that it did not control asset selection for the CDOs in which it invested and that the firm did not place an overall bet against the housing market. The firm said its investments were market neutral and would have made money whether the housing market went up or down.

In 2010, the Securities and Exchange Commission filed a complaint against JP Morgan Chase for a deal in 2007 that involved securities picked by Magnetar Capital. JP Morgan settled the lawsuit for $153.6 million in 2011. Separately, in 2012, The Wall Street Journal reported that the SEC was investigating whether Magnetar Capital had any influence over asset selection of a $1.5 billion CDO created by Merrill Lynch called Norma CDO I, but the SEC took no action against the firm.

In 2010, Magnetar Capital's directors, among others, won the Ig Nobel Prize in economics. That same year, Intesa Sanpaolo named Magnetar Capital, and others, in its lawsuit against Credit Agricole, alleging fraud related to the CDO Pyxis ABS CDO 2006–1; however, the case was dismissed by a judge in 2013.

== See also ==
- List of CDO managers
- Goldman Sachs: Abacus mortgage-backed CDOs
- Merrill Lynch: CDO controversies
- Subprime mortgage crisis
