= Greg Lippmann =

American hedge fund manager

- Born: Greg Holden Lippmann; 1968 or 1969 (age 57–58)
- Education: University of Pennsylvania
- Occupation: Banker
- Spouse: Kimberly Lee Duckworth

Greg Holden Lippmann (born 1968/1969) is an American hedge fund manager, and one of the key figures in Michael Lewis' book The Big Short.

== Early life ==
Greg Lippmann is the son of Susan Lippmann, a business manager at Purchase College, and Thomas J. Lippmann, the retired owner of the DBL Operating Corporation, a real estate investment and management business in New York, both of Edgemont, New York.

He earned a bachelor's degree in economics from the University of Pennsylvania in 1991.

== Career ==
Lippmann worked for Deutsche Bank, as global head of asset-backed securities trading until he left in April 2010.

In February 2010, Lippmann announced that he would be joining a hedge fund started by Fred Brettschneider, who was formerly Deutsche Bank's head of global markets. Lippmann co-founded LibreMax Partners with Brettschneider, and is its Chief Investment Officer and Portfolio Manager.

In May 2016, Bloomberg LP reported that Lippmann was working with Promise Financial on a wedding loans business.

== Personal life ==
On December 14, 2002, he married Dr. Kimberly Lee Duckworth in New York City.

== In popular culture ==
A character based on Lippmann, Jared Vennett, was portrayed by actor Ryan Gosling in the 2015 film The Big Short.
