= Collateralized debt obligation =

Financial product

A collateralized debt obligation (CDO) is a type of structured asset-backed security (ABS). Originally developed as instruments for the corporate debt markets, after 2002 CDOs became vehicles for refinancing mortgage-backed securities (MBS). Like other private label securities backed by assets, a CDO can be thought of as a promise to pay investors in a prescribed sequence, based on the cash flow the CDO collects from the pool of bonds or other assets it owns. Distinctively, CDO credit risk is typically assessed based on a probability of default (PD) derived from ratings on those bonds or assets.

The CDO is "sliced" into sections known as "tranches", which "catch" the cash flow of interest and principal payments in sequence based on seniority. If some loans default and the cash collected by the CDO is insufficient to pay all of its investors, those in the lowest, most "junior" tranches suffer losses first. The last to lose payment from default are the safest, most senior tranches. Consequently, coupon payments (and interest rates) vary by tranche with the safest/most senior tranches receiving the lowest rates and the lowest tranches receiving the highest rates to compensate for higher default risk. As an example, a CDO might issue the following tranches in order of safeness: Senior AAA (sometimes known as "super senior"); Junior AAA; AA; A; BBB; Residual.

Separate special purpose entities—rather than the parent investment bank—issue the CDOs and pay interest to investors. As CDOs developed, some sponsors repackaged tranches into yet another iteration, known as "CDO-Squared" ("CDOs of CDOs") or created insurance markets for them with "synthetic CDOs".

In the early 2000s, the debt underpinning CDOs was generally diversified, but by 2006–2007—when the CDO market grew to hundreds of billions of dollars—this had changed. CDO collateral became dominated by high risk (BBB or A) tranches recycled from other asset-backed securities, whose assets were usually subprime mortgages. These CDOs have been called "the engine that powered the mortgage supply chain" for subprime mortgages, and are credited with giving lenders greater incentive to make subprime loans, leading to the 2007–2009 subprime mortgage crisis.

== Market history ==
=== Beginnings ===
In 1970, the US government-backed mortgage guarantor Ginnie Mae created the first mortgage-backed security (MBS), based on FHA and VA mortgages. It guaranteed these MBSs. This would be the precursor to CDOs that would be created two decades later. In 1971, Freddie Mac issued its first Mortgage Participation Certificate. This was the first MBS made of ordinary mortgages. All through the 1970s, private companies began mortgage asset securitization by creating private mortgage pools.

In 1974, the Equal Credit Opportunity Act in the United States imposed heavy sanctions for financial institutions found guilty of discrimination on the basis of race, color, religion, national origin, sex, marital status, or age. This led to a more open policy of giving loans (sometimes subprime) by banks, guaranteed in most cases by Fannie Mae and Freddie Mac. In 1977, the Community Reinvestment Act was enacted to address historical discrimination in lending, such as 'redlining'. The Act encouraged commercial banks and savings associations (Savings and loan banks) to meet the needs of borrowers in all segments of their communities, including low- and moderate-income neighborhoods (who might earlier have been thought of as too risky for home loans).

In 1977, the investment bank Salomon Brothers created a "private label" MBS - one that did not involve government-sponsored enterprise (GSE) mortgages. However, it failed in the marketplace. Subsequently, Lewis Ranieri (Salomon) and Larry Fink (First Boston) invented the idea of securitization; different mortgages were pooled together and this pool was then sliced into tranches, each of which was then sold separately to different investors. Many of these tranches were in turn bundled together, earning them the name CDO (Collateralized debt obligation).

The first CDOs to be issued by a private bank were seen in 1987 by the bankers at the now-defunct Drexel Burnham Lambert Inc. for the also now-defunct Imperial Savings Association. During the 1990s the collateral of CDOs was generally corporate and emerging market bonds and bank loans. After 1998 "multi-sector" CDOs were developed by Prudential Securities, but CDOs remained fairly obscure until after 2000. In 2002 and 2003 CDOs had a setback when rating agencies "were forced to downgrade hundreds" of the securities, but sales of CDOs grew—from $69 billion in 2000 to around $500 billion in 2006. From 2004 through 2007, $1.4 trillion worth of CDOs were issued.

Early CDOs were diversified, and might include everything from aircraft lease-equipment debt, manufactured housing loans, to student loans and credit card debt. The diversification of borrowers in these "multisector CDOs" was a selling point, as it meant that if there was a downturn in one industry like aircraft manufacturing and their loans defaulted, other industries like manufactured housing might be unaffected. Another selling point was that CDOs offered returns that were sometimes 2–3 percentage points higher than corporate bonds with the same credit rating.

==== Explanations for growth ====
- Advantages of securitization – Depository banks had incentive to "securitize" loans they originated—often in the form of CDO securities—because this removes the loans from their books. The transfer of these loans (along with related risk) to security-buying investors in return for cash frees up the banks' capital. This enabled them to remain in compliance with capital requirement laws while lending again and generating additional origination fees.
- Global demand for fixed income investments – From 2000 to 2007, worldwide fixed income investment (i.e. investments in bonds and other conservative securities) roughly doubled in size to $70 trillion, yet the supply of relatively safe, income generating investments had not grown as fast, which bid up bond prices and drove down interest rates. Investment banks on Wall Street answered this demand with financial innovation such as the mortgage-backed security (MBS) and collateralized debt obligation (CDO), which were assigned safe ratings by the credit rating agencies.
- Low interest rates – Fears of deflation, the bursting of the dot-com bubble, a U.S. recession, and the U.S. trade deficit kept interest rates low globally from 2000 to 2004–5, according to Economist Mark Zandi. The low yield of the safe US Treasury bonds created demand by global investors for subprime mortgage-backed CDOs with their relatively high-yields but credit ratings as high as the Treasuries. This search for yield by global investors caused many to purchase CDOs, though they lived to regret trusting the credit rating agencies' ratings.
- Pricing models – Gaussian copula models, introduced in 2001 by David X. Li, allowed for the rapid pricing of CDOs.

=== Subprime mortgage boom ===
Source: Final Report of the National Commission on the Causes of the Financial and Economic Crisis in the United States, p.128, figure 8.1

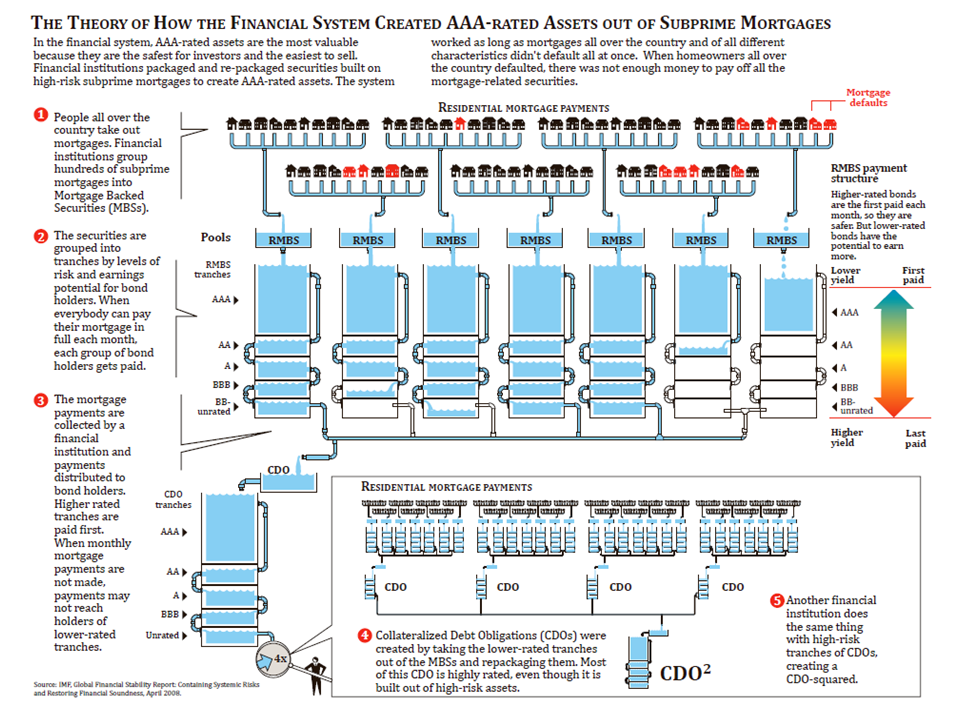
IMF Diagram of CDO and RMBS

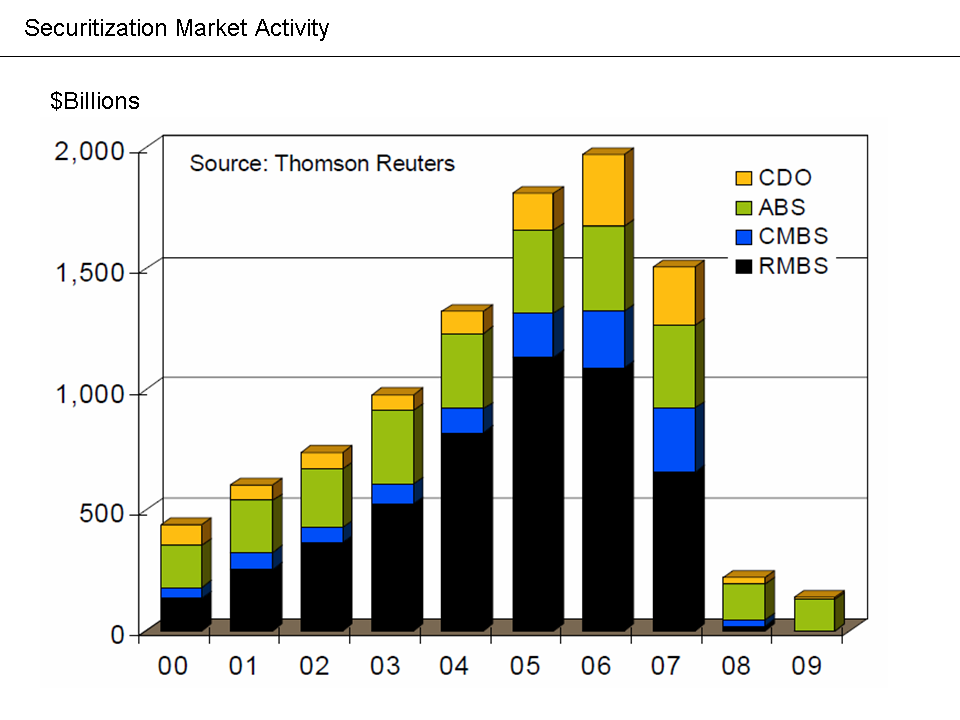
Securitization markets were impaired during the crisis.

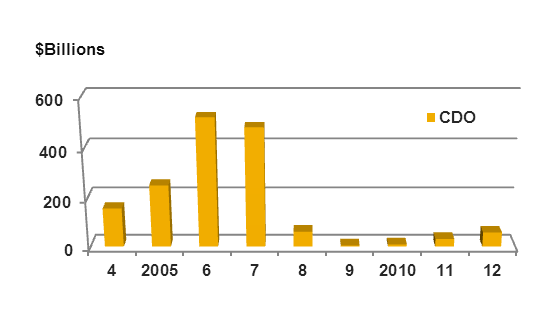
The volume of CDOs issued globally crashed during the subprime crisis but has recovered slightly. (source: SIFMA, Statistics, Structured Finance

In 2005, as the CDO market continued to grow, subprime mortgages began to replace the diversified consumer loans as collateral. By 2004, mortgage-backed securities accounted for more than half of the collateral in CDOs. According to the Financial Crisis Inquiry Report, "the CDO became the engine that powered the mortgage supply chain", promoting an increase in demand for mortgage-backed securities without which lenders would have "had less reason to push so hard to make" non-prime loans. CDOs not only bought crucial tranches of subprime mortgage-backed securities, they provided cash for the initial funding of the securities. Between 2003 and 2007, Wall Street issued almost $700 billion in CDOs that included mortgage-backed securities as collateral. Despite this loss of diversification, CDO tranches were given the same proportion of high ratings by rating agencies on the grounds that mortgages were diversified by region and so "uncorrelated"—though those ratings were lowered after mortgage holders began to default.

The rise of "ratings arbitrage"—i.e., pooling low-rated tranches to make CDOs—helped push sales of CDOs to about $500 billion in 2006, with a global CDO market of over US$1.5 trillion. CDO was the fastest-growing sector of the structured finance market between 2003 and 2006; the number of CDO tranches issued in 2006 (9,278) was almost twice the number of tranches issued in 2005 (4,706).

CDOs, like mortgage-backed securities, were financed with debt, enhancing their profits but also enhancing losses if the market reversed course.

==== Explanations for growth ====
Subprime mortgages had been financed by mortgage-backed securities (MBS). Like CDOs, MBSs were structured into tranches, but issuers of the securities had difficulty selling the more lower level/lower-rated "mezzanine" tranches—the tranches rated somewhere from AA to BB.

Because most traditional mortgage investors are risk-averse, either because of the restrictions of their investment charters or business practices, they are interested in buying the higher-rated segments of the loan stack; as a result, those slices are easiest to sell. The more challenging task is finding buyers for the riskier pieces at the bottom of the pile. The way mortgage securities are structured, if you cannot find buyers for the lower-rated slices, the rest of the pool cannot be sold.

To deal with the problem, investment bankers "recycled" the mezzanine tranches, selling them to underwriters making more structured securities—CDOs. Though the pool that made up the CDO collateral might be overwhelmingly mezzanine tranches, most of the tranches (70 to 80%) of the CDO were rated not BBB, A−, etc., but triple A. The minority of the tranches that were mezzanine were often bought up by other CDOs, concentrating the lower rated tranches still further. (See the chart on "The Theory of How the Financial System Created AAA-rated Assets out of Subprime Mortgages".)

As journalist Gretchen Morgenson put it, CDOs became "the perfect dumping ground for the low-rated slices Wall Street couldn't sell on its own."

Other factors explaining the popularity of CDOs include:

- Growing demand for fixed income investments that started earlier in the decade continued. A "global savings glut" leading to "large capital inflows" from abroad helped finance the housing boom, keeping down US mortgage rates, even after the Federal Reserve Bank had raised interest rates to cool off the economy.
- Supply generated by "hefty" fees the CDO industry earned. According to "one hedge fund manager who became a big investor in CDOs", as much "as 40 to 50 percent" of the cash flow generated by the assets in a CDO went to "pay the bankers, the CDO manager, the rating agencies, and others who took out fees." Rating agencies in particular—whose high ratings of the CDO tranches were crucial to the industry and who were paid by CDO issuers —earned extraordinary profits. Moody's Investors Service, one of the two biggest rating agencies, could earn "as much as $250,000 to rate a mortgage pool with $350 million in assets, versus the $50,000 in fees generated when rating a municipal bond of a similar size." In 2006, revenues from Moody's structured finance division "accounted for fully 44%" of all Moody's sales. Moody's operating margins were "consistently over 50%, making it one of the most profitable companies in existence"—more profitable in terms of margins than ExxonMobil or Microsoft. Between the time Moody's was spun off as a public company and February 2007, its stock rose 340%.
- Trust in rating agencies. CDO managers "didn't always have to disclose what the securities contained" because the contents of the CDO were subject to change. But this lack of transparency did not affect demand for the securities. Investors "weren't so much buying a security. They were buying a triple-A rating," according to business journalists Bethany McLean and Joe Nocera.
- Financial innovations, such as credit default swaps and synthetic CDO. Credit default swaps provided insurance to investors against the possibility of losses in the value of tranches from default in exchange for premium-like payments, making CDOs appear "to be virtually risk-free" to investors. Synthetic CDOs were cheaper and easier to create than original "cash" CDOs. Synthetics "referenced" cash CDOs, replacing interest payments from MBS tranches with premium-like payments from credit default swaps. Rather than providing funding for housing, synthetic CDO-buying investors were in effect providing insurance against mortgage default. If the CDO did not perform per contractual requirements, one counterparty (typically a large investment bank or hedge fund) had to pay another. As underwriting standards deteriorated and the housing market became saturated, subprime mortgages became less abundant. Synthetic CDOs began to fill in for the original cash CDOs. Because more than one—in fact numerous—synthetics could be made to reference the same original, the amount of money that moved among market participants increased dramatically.

=== Crash ===
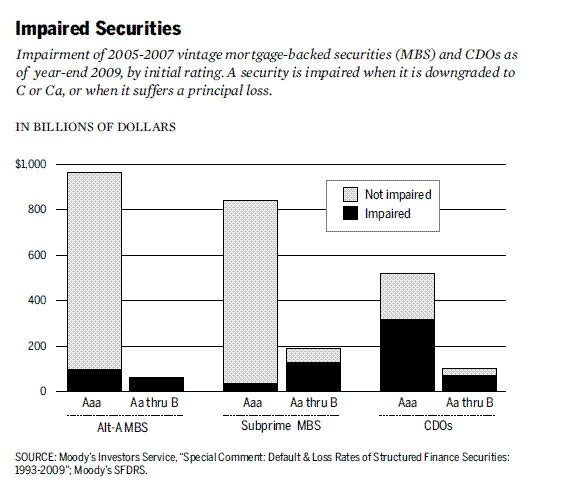
More than half of the highest-rated (Aaa) CDOs were "impaired" (losing principal or downgraded to junk status), compared to a small fraction of similarly rated Subprime and Alt-A mortgage-backed securities. (source: Financial Crisis Inquiry Report)

In the summer of 2006, the Case–Shiller index of house prices peaked. In California, home prices had more than doubled since 2000 and median house prices in Los Angeles had risen to ten times the median annual income. To entice those with low and moderate income to sign up for mortgages, down payments and income documentation were often dispensed with and interest and principal payments were often deferred upon request. Journalist Michael Lewis gave as an example of unsustainable underwriting practices a loan in Bakersfield, California, where "a Mexican strawberry picker with an income of $14,000 and no English was lent every penny he needed to buy a house of $724,000". As two-year "teaser" mortgage rates—common with those that made home purchases like this possible—expired, mortgage payments skyrocketed. Refinancing to lower mortgage payment was no longer available since it depended on rising home prices. Mezzanine tranches started to lose value in 2007; by mid year AA tranches were worth only 70 cents on the dollar. By October triple-A tranches had started to fall. Regional diversification notwithstanding, the mortgage backed securities turned out to be highly correlated.

Big CDO arrangers like Citigroup, Merrill Lynch and UBS experienced some of the biggest losses, as did financial guarantors such as AIG, Ambac, MBIA.

An early indicator of the crisis came in July 2007 when rating agencies made unprecedented mass downgrades of mortgage-related securities (by the end of 2008 91% of CDO securities were downgraded), and two highly leveraged Bear Stearns hedge funds holding MBSs and CDOs collapsed. Investors were informed by Bear Stearns that they would get little if any of their money back.

In October and November the CEOs of Merrill Lynch and Citigroup resigned after reporting multibillion-dollar losses and CDO downgrades. As the global market for CDOs dried up the new issue pipeline for CDOs slowed significantly, and what CDO issuance there was usually in the form of collateralized loan obligations backed by middle-market or leveraged bank loans, rather than home mortgage ABS. The CDO collapse hurt mortgage credit available to homeowners since the bigger MBS market depended on CDO purchases of mezzanine tranches.

While non-prime mortgage defaults affected all securities backed by mortgages, CDOs were especially hard hit. More than half—$300 billion worth—of tranches issued in 2005, 2006, and 2007 rated most safe (triple-A) by rating agencies, were either downgraded to junk status or lost principal by 2009. In comparison, only small fractions of triple-A tranches of Alt-A or subprime mortgage-backed securities suffered the same fate. (See the Impaired Securities chart.)

Collateralized debt obligations also made up over half ($542 billion) of the nearly trillion dollars in losses suffered by financial institutions from 2007 to early 2009.

=== Criticism ===
Prior to the crisis, a few academics, analysts and investors such as Warren Buffett (who famously disparaged CDOs and other derivatives as "financial weapons of mass destruction, carrying dangers that, while now latent, are potentially lethal"), and the IMF's former chief economist Raghuram Rajan warned that rather than reducing risk through diversification, CDOs and other derivatives spread risk and uncertainty about the value of the underlying assets more widely.

During and after the crisis, criticism of the CDO market was more vocal. According to the radio documentary "Giant Pool of Money", it was the strong demand for MBS and CDO that drove down home lending standards. Mortgages were needed for collateral and by approximately 2003, the supply of mortgages originated at traditional lending standards had been exhausted.

The head of banking supervision and regulation at the Federal Reserve, Patrick Parkinson, termed "the whole concept of ABS CDOs", an "abomination".

In December 2007, journalists Carrick Mollenkamp and Serena Ng wrote of a CDO called Norma created by Merrill Lynch at the behest of Illinois hedge fund, Magnetar. It was a tailor-made bet on subprime mortgages that went "too far." Janet Tavakoli, a Chicago consultant who specializes in CDOs, said Norma "is a tangled hairball of risk." When it came to market in March 2007, "any savvy investor would have thrown this...in the trash bin."

According to journalists Bethany McLean and Joe Nocera, no securities became "more pervasive – or [did] more damage than collateralized debt obligations" to create the Great Recession.

Gretchen Morgenson described the securities as "a sort of secret refuse heap for toxic mortgages [that] created even more demand for bad loans from wanton lenders."

CDOs prolonged the mania, vastly amplifying the losses that investors would suffer and ballooning the amounts of taxpayer money that would be required to rescue companies like Citigroup and the American International Group." ...

In the first quarter of 2008 alone, credit rating agencies announced 4,485 downgrades of CDOs. At least some analysts complained the agencies over-relied on computer models with imprecise inputs, failed to account adequately for large risks (like a nationwide collapse of housing values), and assumed the risk of the low rated tranches that made up CDOs would be diluted when in fact the mortgage risks were highly correlated, and when one mortgage defaulted, many did, affected by the same financial events.

They were strongly criticized by economist Joseph Stiglitz, among others. Stiglitz considered the agencies "one of the key culprits" of the crisis that "performed that alchemy that converted the securities from F-rated to A-rated. The banks could not have done what they did without the complicity of the ratings agencies." According to Morgenson, the agencies had pretended to transform "dross into gold."

"As usual, the ratings agencies were chronically behind on developments in the financial markets and they could barely keep up with the new instruments springing from the brains of Wall Street's rocket scientists. Fitch, Moody's, and S&P paid their analysts far less than the big brokerage firms did and, not surprisingly wound up employing people who were often looking to befriend, accommodate, and impress the Wall Street clients in hopes of getting hired by them for a multiple increase in pay. ... Their [the rating agencies] failure to recognize that mortgage underwriting standards had decayed or to account for the possibility that real estate prices could decline completely undermined the ratings agencies' models and undercut their ability to estimate losses that these securities might generate."

Michael Lewis also pronounced the transformation of BBB tranches into 80% triple A CDOs as "dishonest", "artificial" and the result of "fat fees" paid to rating agencies by Goldman Sachs and other Wall Street firms. However, if the collateral had been sufficient, those ratings would have been correct, according to the FDIC.

Synthetic CDOs were criticized in particular, because of the difficulties to judge (and price) the risk inherent in that kind of securities correctly. That adverse effect roots in the pooling and tranching activities on every level of the derivation.

Others pointed out the risk of undoing the connection between borrowers and lenders—removing the lender's incentive to only pick borrowers who were creditworthy—inherent in all securitization. According to economist Mark Zandi: "As shaky mortgages were combined, diluting any problems into a larger pool, the incentive for responsibility was undermined."

Zandi and others also criticized lack of regulation. "Finance companies weren't subject to the same regulatory oversight as banks. Taxpayers weren't on the hook if they went belly up [pre-crisis], only their shareholders and other creditors were. Finance companies thus had little to discourage them from growing as aggressively as possible, even if that meant lowering or winking at traditional lending standards."

In July 2011, Goldman Sachs settled the securities fraud charges of the Securities and Exchange Commission in SEC v. Goldman Sachs (2010) by accepting a civil penalty of $550 million and acknowledging that its marketing materials for the CDO ABACUS 2007-AC1 transaction contained incomplete information.

== Concept, structures, varieties ==
=== Concept ===
CDOs vary in structure and underlying assets, but the basic principle is the same. A CDO is a type of asset-backed security. To create a CDO, a corporate entity is constructed to hold assets as collateral backing packages of cash flows which are sold to investors. A sequence in constructing a CDO is:

- A special purpose entity (SPE) is designed/constructed to acquire a portfolio of underlying assets. Common underlying assets held may include mortgage-backed securities, commercial real estate bonds and corporate loans.
- The SPE issues bonds to investors in exchange for cash, which are used to purchase the portfolio of underlying assets. Like other ABS private label securities, the bonds are not uniform but issued in layers called tranches, each with different risk characteristics. Senior tranches are paid from the cash flows from the underlying assets before the junior tranches and equity tranches. Losses are first borne by the equity tranches, next by the junior tranches, and finally by the senior tranches.

A common analogy compares the cash flow from the CDO's portfolio of securities (say mortgage payments from mortgage-backed bonds) to water flowing into cups of the investors where senior tranches were filled first and overflowing cash flowed to junior tranches, then equity tranches. If a large portion of the mortgages enter default, there is insufficient cash flow to fill all these cups and equity tranche investors face the losses first.

The risk and return for a CDO investor depends both on how the tranches are defined, and on the underlying assets. In particular, the investment depends on the assumptions and methods used to define the risk and return of the tranches. CDOs, like all asset-backed securities, enable the originators of the underlying assets to pass credit risk to another institution or to individual investors. Thus investors must understand how the risk for CDOs is calculated.

The issuer of the CDO, typically an investment bank, earns a commission at the time of issue and earns management fees during the life of the CDO. The ability to earn substantial fees from originating CDOs, coupled with the absence of any residual liability, skews the incentives of originators in favor of loan volume rather than loan quality.

In some cases, the assets held by one CDO consisted entirely of equity layer tranches issued by other CDOs. This explains why some CDOs became entirely worthless, as the equity layer tranches were paid last in the sequence and there was not sufficient cash flow from the underlying subprime mortgages (many of which defaulted) to trickle down to the equity layers.

Ultimately the challenge is in accurately quantifying the risk and return characteristics of these constructs. Since the introduction of David Li's 2001 model, there have been material advances in techniques that more accurately model dynamics for these complex securities.

=== Structures ===
CDO refers to several different types of products. The primary classifications are as follows:

Source of funds—cash flow vs. market value

- Cash flow CDOs pay interest and principal to tranche holders using the cash flows produced by the CDO's assets. Cash flow CDOs focus primarily on managing the credit quality of the underlying portfolio.
- Market value CDOs attempt to enhance investor returns through the more frequent trading and profitable sale of collateral assets. The CDO asset manager seeks to realize capital gains on the assets in the CDO's portfolio. There is greater focus on the changes in market value of the CDO's assets. Market value CDOs are longer-established, but less common than cash flow CDOs.

Motivation—arbitrage vs. balance sheet

- Arbitrage transactions (cash flow and market value) attempt to capture for equity investors the spread between the relatively high yielding assets and the lower yielding liabilities represented by the rated bonds. The majority, 86%, of CDOs are arbitrage-motivated.
- Balance sheet transactions, by contrast, are primarily motivated by the issuing institutions' desire to remove loans and other assets from their balance sheets, to reduce their regulatory capital requirements and improve their return on risk capital. A bank may wish to offload the credit risk to reduce its balance sheet's credit risk.

Funding—cash vs. synthetic

- Cash CDOs involve a portfolio of cash assets, such as loans, corporate bonds, asset-backed securities or mortgage-backed securities. Ownership of the assets is transferred to the legal entity (known as a special purpose vehicle) issuing the CDO's tranches. The risk of loss on the assets is divided among tranches in reverse order of seniority. Cash CDO issuance exceeded $400 billion in 2006.
- Synthetic CDOs do not own cash assets like bonds or loans. Instead, synthetic CDOs gain credit exposure to a portfolio of fixed income assets without owning those assets through the use of credit default swaps, a derivatives instrument. (Under such a swap, the credit protection seller, the Synthetic CDO, receives periodic cash payments, called premiums, in exchange for agreeing to assume the risk of loss on a specific asset in the event that asset experiences a default or other credit event.) Like a cash CDO, the risk of loss on the Synthetic CDO's portfolio is divided into tranches. Losses will first affect the equity tranche, next the junior tranches, and finally the senior tranche. Each tranche receives a periodic payment (the swap premium), with the junior tranches offering higher premiums.
  - A synthetic CDO tranche may be either funded or unfunded. Under the swap agreements, the CDO could have to pay up to a certain amount of money in the event of a credit event on the reference obligations in the CDO's reference portfolio. Some of this credit exposure is funded at the time of investment by the investors in funded tranches. Typically, the junior tranches that face the greatest risk of experiencing a loss have to fund at closing. Until a credit event occurs, the proceeds provided by the funded tranches are often invested in high-quality, liquid assets or placed in a GIC (guaranteed investment contract) account that offers a return that is a few basis points below LIBOR. The return from these investments plus the premium from the swap counterparty provide the cash flow stream to pay interest to the funded tranches. When a credit event occurs and a payout to the swap counterparty is required, the required payment is made from the GIC or reserve account that holds the liquid investments. In contrast, senior tranches are usually unfunded as the risk of loss is much lower. Unlike a cash CDO, investors in a senior tranche receive periodic payments but do not place any capital in the CDO when entering into the investment. Instead, the investors retain continuing funding exposure and may have to make a payment to the CDO in the event the portfolio's losses reach the senior tranche. Funded synthetic issuance exceeded $80 billion in 2006. From an issuance perspective, synthetic CDOs take less time to create. Cash assets do not have to be purchased and managed, and the CDO's tranches can be precisely structured.
- Hybrid CDOs have a portfolio including both cash assets—like cash CDOs—and swaps that give the CDO credit exposure to additional assets—like a synthetic CDO. A portion of the proceeds from the funded tranches is invested in cash assets and the remainder is held in reserve to cover payments that may be required under the credit default swaps. The CDO receives payments from three sources: the return from the cash assets, the GIC or reserve account investments, and the CDO premiums.

Single-tranche CDOs
The flexibility of credit default swaps is used to construct Single Tranche CDOs (bespoke tranche CDOs) where the entire CDO is structured specifically for a single or small group of investors, and the remaining tranches are never sold but held by the dealer based on valuations from internal models. Residual risk is delta-hedged by the dealer.

Structured Operating Companies
Unlike CDOs, which are terminating structures that typically wind-down or refinance at the end of their financing term, Structured Operating Companies are permanently capitalized variants of CDOs, with an active management team and infrastructure. They often issue term notes, commercial paper, and/or auction rate securities, depending upon the structural and portfolio characteristics of the company. Credit Derivative Products Companies (CDPC) and Structured Investment Vehicles (SIV) are examples, with CDPC taking risk synthetically and SIV with predominantly 'cash' exposure.

=== Taxation ===
The issuer of a CDO—usually a special purpose entity—is typically a corporation established outside the United States to avoid being subject to U.S. federal income taxation on its global income. These corporations must restrict their activities to avoid U.S. tax liabilities; corporations that are deemed to engage in trade or business in the U.S. will be subject to federal taxation. Foreign corporations that only invest in and hold portfolios of U.S. stock and debt securities are not. Investing, unlike trading or dealing, is not considered to be a trade or business, regardless of its volume or frequency.

In addition, a safe harbor protects CDO issuers that do trade actively in securities, even though trading in securities technically is a business, provided the issuer's activities do not cause it to be viewed as a dealer in securities or engaged in a banking, lending or similar businesses.

CDOs are generally taxable as debt instruments except for the most junior class of CDOs which are treated as equity and are subject to special rules (such as PFIC and CFC reporting). The PFIC and CFC reporting is very complex and requires a specialized accountant to perform these calculations and manage the tax reporting obligations.

=== Types ===
A) Based on the underlying asset:

- Collateralized loan obligations (CLOs): CDOs backed primarily by leveraged bank loans.
- Collateralized bond obligations (CBOs): CDOs backed primarily by leveraged fixed income securities.
- Collateralized synthetic obligations (CSOs): CDOs backed primarily by credit derivatives.
- Structured finance CDOs (SFCDOs): CDOs backed primarily by structured products (such as asset-backed securities and mortgage-backed securities).

B) Other types of CDOs by assets/collateral include:

- Commercial Real Estate CDOs (CRE CDOs): backed primarily by commercial real estate assets
- Collateralized bond obligations (CBOs): CDOs backed primarily by corporate bonds
- Collateralized compute obligations (CCOs): SFCDOs backed primarily by AI data center-related securities.
- Collateralized Insurance Obligations (CIOs): backed by insurance or, more usually, reinsurance contracts
- CDO-Squared: CDOs backed primarily by the tranches issued by other CDOs.
- CDO^n: Generic term for CDO^{3} (CDO cubed) and higher, where the CDO is backed by other CDOs/CDO^{2}/CDO^{3}. These are particularly difficult vehicles to model because of the possible repetition of exposures in the underlying CDO.

=== Types of collateral ===
The collateral for cash CDOs include:

- Structured finance securities (mortgage-backed securities, home equity asset-backed securities, commercial mortgage-backed securities)
- Leveraged loans
- Corporate bonds
- Real estate investment trust (REIT) debt
- Commercial real estate mortgage debt (including whole loans, B notes, and Mezzanine debt)
- Project finance debt
- Trust Preferred securities

=== Transaction participants ===
Participants in a CDO transaction include investors, the underwriter, the asset manager, the trustee and collateral administrator, accountants and attorneys. Beginning in 1999, the Gramm-Leach-Bliley Act allowed banks to also participate.

==== Investors ====
Investors—buyers of CDO—include insurance companies, mutual fund companies, unit trusts, investment trusts, commercial banks, investment banks, pension fund managers, private banking organizations, other CDOs and structured investment vehicles. Investors have different motivations for purchasing CDO securities depending on which tranche they select. At the more senior levels of debt, investors are able to obtain better yields than those that are available on more traditional securities (e.g., corporate bonds) of a similar rating. In some cases, investors utilize leverage and hope to profit from the excess of the spread offered by the senior tranche and their cost of borrowing. This is true because senior tranches pay a spread above LIBOR despite their AAA-ratings. Investors also benefit from the diversification of the CDO portfolio, the expertise of the asset manager, and the credit support built into the transaction. Investors include banks and insurance companies as well as investment funds.

Junior tranche investors achieve a leveraged, non-recourse investment in the underlying diversified collateral portfolio. Mezzanine notes and equity notes offer yields that are not available in most other fixed income securities. Investors include hedge funds, banks, and wealthy individuals.

==== Underwriter ====
The underwriter of a CDO is typically an investment bank, and acts as the structurer and arranger. Working with the asset management firm that selects the CDO's portfolio, the underwriter structures debt and equity tranches. This includes selecting the debt-to-equity ratio, sizing each tranche, establishing coverage and collateral quality tests, and working with the credit rating agencies to gain the desired ratings for each debt tranche.

The key economic consideration for an underwriter that is considering bringing a new deal to market is whether the transaction can offer a sufficient return to the equity noteholders. Such a determination requires estimating the after-default return offered by the portfolio of debt securities and comparing it to the cost of funding the CDO's rated notes. The excess spread must be large enough to offer the potential of attractive IRRs to the equity holders.

Other underwriter responsibilities include working with a law firm and creating the special purpose legal vehicle (typically a trust incorporated in the Cayman Islands) that will purchase the assets and issue the CDO's tranches. In addition, the underwriter will work with the asset manager to determine the post-closing trading restrictions that will be included in the CDO's transaction documents and other files.

The final step is to price the CDO (i.e., set the coupons for each debt tranche) and place the tranches with investors. The priority in placement is finding investors for the risky equity tranche and junior debt tranches (A, BBB, etc.) of the CDO. It is common for the asset manager to retain a piece of the equity tranche. In addition, the underwriter was generally expected to provide some type of secondary market liquidity for the CDO, especially its more senior tranches.

According to Thomson Financial, the top underwriters before September 2008 were Bear Stearns, Merrill Lynch, Wachovia, Citigroup, Deutsche Bank, and Bank of America Securities. CDOs are more profitable for underwriters than conventional bond underwriting because of the complexity involved. The underwriter is paid a fee when the CDO is issued.

==== The asset manager ====
The asset manager plays a key role in each CDO transaction, even after the CDO is issued. An experienced manager is critical in both the construction and maintenance of the CDO's portfolio. The manager can maintain the credit quality of a CDO's portfolio through trades as well as maximize recovery rates when defaults on the underlying assets occur.

In theory, the asset manager should add value in the manner outlined below, although in practice, this did not occur during the credit bubble of the mid-2000s (decade). In addition, it is now understood that the structural flaw in all asset-backed securities (originators profit from loan volume not loan quality) make the roles of subsequent participants peripheral to the quality of the investment.

The asset manager's role begins in the months before a CDO is issued, a bank usually provides financing to the manager to purchase some of the collateral assets for the forthcoming CDO. This process is called warehousing.

Even by the issuance date, the asset manager often will not have completed the construction of the CDO's portfolio. A "ramp-up" period following issuance during which the remaining assets are purchased can extend for several months after the CDO is issued. For this reason, some senior CDO notes are structured as delayed drawdown notes, allowing the asset manager to draw down cash from investors as collateral purchases are made. When a transaction is fully ramped, its initial portfolio of credits has been selected by the asset manager.

However, the asset manager's role continues even after the ramp-up period ends, albeit in a less active role. During the CDO's "reinvestment period", which usually extends several years past the issuance date of the CDO, the asset manager is authorized to reinvest principal proceeds by purchasing additional debt securities. Within the confines of the trading restrictions specified in the CDO's transaction documents, the asset manager can also make trades to maintain the credit quality of the CDO's portfolio. The manager also has a role in the redemption of a CDO's notes by auction call.

There are approximately 300 asset managers in the marketplace. CDO asset managers, as with other asset managers, can be more or less active depending on the personality and prospectus of the CDO. Asset managers make money by virtue of the senior fee (which is paid before any of the CDO investors are paid) and subordinated fee as well as any equity investment the manager has in the CDO, making CDOs a lucrative business for asset managers. These fees, together with underwriting fees, administration—approx 1.5 – 2% —by virtue of capital structure are provided by the equity investment, by virtue of reduced cash flow.

==== The trustee and collateral administrator ====
The trustee holds title to the assets of the CDO for the benefit of the "noteholders" (i.e., the investors). In the CDO market, the trustee also typically serves as collateral administrator. In this role, the collateral administrator produces and distributes noteholder reports, performs various compliance tests regarding the composition and liquidity of the asset portfolios in addition to constructing and executing the priority of payment waterfall models. In contrast to the asset manager, there are relatively few trustees in the marketplace. The following institutions offer trustee services in the CDO marketplace:

- Bank of New York Mellon (note: the Bank of New York Mellon acquired the corporate trust unit of JP Morgan),
- BNP Paribas Securities Services (note: currently serves the European market only)
- Citibank
- Deutsche Bank
- Equity Trust
- Intertrust Group (note: until mid-2009 was known as Fortis Intertrust; Acquired ATC Capital Markets in 2013)
- HSBC
- Sanne Trust
- State Street Corporation
- US Bank (note: US Bank acquired the corporate trust unit of Wachovia in 2008 and Bank of America in September 2011, which had previously acquired LaSalle Bank in 2010, and is the current market share leader)
- Wells Fargo
- Wilmington Trust: Wilmington shut down their business in early 2009.

==== Accountants ====
The underwriter typically will hire an accounting firm to perform due diligence on the CDO's portfolio of debt securities. This entails verifying certain attributes, such as credit rating and coupon/spread, of each collateral security. Source documents or public sources will typically be used to tie-out the collateral pool information. In addition, the accountants typically calculate certain collateral tests and determine whether the portfolio is in compliance with such tests.

The firm may also perform a cash flow tie-out in which the transaction's waterfall is modeled per the priority of payments set forth in the transaction documents. The yield and weighted average life of the bonds or equity notes being issued is then calculated based on the modeling assumptions provided by the underwriter. On each payment date, an accounting firm may work with the trustee to verify the distributions that are scheduled to be made to the noteholders.

==== Attorneys ====
Attorneys ensure compliance with applicable securities law and negotiate and draft the transaction documents. Attorneys will also draft an offering document or prospectus the purpose of which is to satisfy statutory requirements to disclose certain information to investors. This will be circulated to investors. It is common for multiple counsels to be involved in a single deal because of the number of parties to a single CDO from asset management firms to underwriters.

== In popular media ==
In the 2015 biographical film The Big Short, CDOs of mortgage-backed securities are described metaphorically as "dog shit wrapped in cat shit".

== See also ==
- Asset-backed security
- Bespoke portfolio (CDO)
- Collateralized mortgage obligation (CMO)
- Collateralized fund obligation (CFO)
- Collateralized loan obligation (CLO)
- List of CDO managers
- Credit default swap
- Single-tranche CDO
- Synthetic CDO
- Great Recession
  - United States housing bubble
  - Subprime mortgage crisis
  - 2008 financial crisis
