= Tricadia Capital =

American asset management firm

- Company type: Private
- Industry: Hedge funds
- Founded: 2003
- Founder: Michael Barnes; Arif Inayatullah
- Defunct: 2020
- Headquarters: New York City, New York, United States
- Website: tricadiacapital.com

Tricadia Capital Management, LLC ("Tricadia Capital") was a New York-based asset management company. As of July 17, 2020, its primary website is offline.

== History ==
Tricadia Capital was a multi-strategy credit manager for hedge funds and alternative investment accounts. Tricadia Capital's predecessor was formed in 2003 by Michael Barnes and Arif Inayatullah. Tricadia Capital was a wholly owned subsidiary of Tricadia Holdings, L.P. (“Tricadia Holdings”), which was controlled by Messrs, Barnes and Inayatullah. Tricadia Holdings also owned Tricadia CDO Management, LLC. Tricadia Holdings is associated with Mariner Investment Group, LLC, which provided certain support services for the firm.

Before founding Tricadia Holdings, Mr. Barnes had worked at UBS and Paine Webber, and Bear Stearns. Mr. Inayatullah had worked at UBS, BroadStreet Group, and Credit Agricole Indosuez.

In December 2018, Management of Tricadia Capital is closing its hedge funds. The closures come after assets plummeted from a high of over $4 billion in 2014 in its flagship credit strategy. Tricadia will return around $800 million to investors in its Credit Strategy Fund and the company has already given customers over $150 million to its Convexity fund.

In August 2019, Tricadia buys First Midwest Bancorp Inc, iShares Core S&P 500 ETF. As of the 2nd Quarter of 2019, Tricadia Capital Management, LLC owns 3 stocks with value totalling $43 million.

== Synthetic CDO ==
In 2004, Tricadia CDO Management, LLC was the first North American organization to issue a "synthetic CDO-squared" deal, which it did in conjunction with Citibank.
