= CUSIP-linked MIP code =

The CUSIP-linked MIP code (CLIP) is used in the financial derivatives markets to identify the reference entity of a credit default swap. It is mainly used as a key field in Markit's reference entity database (RED). Each CLIP is linked with one or more CUSIPs each representing reference entity obligations (securities).

For example, CLIP of WESTLAB AG (reference entity) is 'DMFCCI'. There are multiple issues from WESTLAB AG each with different CUSIPs (D96637AG4, D96637AH2, D96637AK5 etc.).

MIP is a synonym of Markit Partners. CLIP is known with multiple names like Markit RED code, RED CLIP or simply CLIPS. S&P and Markit Partners introduced CLIP concept and entity CLIP codes are generated by the S&P CUSIP Bureau and are assigned to each entity name individually. CLIP codes are used for electronic matching on DTCC and have been integrated in various online platforms.

== See also ==
- CUSIP
- Credit default swap
- S&P
