= List of CDO managers =

Collateralized debt obligations (CDOs) involve several parties. The following is a list of CDO managers and sponsors.

== CDO managers ==
- GoldenTree Asset Management
- Trust Company of the West
- Cohen & Company
- Ellington Management
- Deutsche Bank
- Wharton Asset Management
- Credit Suisse
- Vanderbilt Capital Advisors
- First Tennessee
- Deerfield Capital
- PIMCO
- WestLB
- Aladdin Capital
- Highland Capital Management
- Fortress Investments
- Bear Stearns
- BNP Paribas
- Resource America
- Citigroup
- MassMutual
- Merrill Lynch
- Invesco
- Rabobank
- Intermediate Capital Group

== CDO sponsors ==
- Merrill
- Citigroup
- UBS
- Deutsche Bank
- LNR Partners
- NorthStar
- Newcastle Investments
- BlackRock
- Sorin Capital Management
- Massachusetts Financial Services
- ARCap
- Capital Trust
- CWCapital
- Marathon Asset Management
- Guggenheim Structured Real Estate
- Teachers Insurance
- Arbor Realty
- Goldman Sachs
- Maples Finance
- Wrightwood Capital
- JE Robert Cos
- Brascan Real Estate Financial Partners
- CBRE Realty Finance
- Legg Mason Real Estate Investors
- Attentus Management
- Alliance Capital Management
- Five Mile Capital
- Morgan Stanley
- Prima Capital
- UNIQA Alternative Investments
- Credit Suisse
- Fortress Investments
- Shinsei Bank
- Vertical Capital
- Capital Lease Funding
- Redwood Trust
- Deutsche Genossenschafts-Hypothekenbank
- Collineo Asset Management
- Arch Commercial
- Maples Finance
