= CDO-Squared =

Financial product backed by tranches from other CDOs

CDO-Squared is an investment in the form of a special-purpose entity (SPE) with securitization payments backed by collateralized debt obligation tranches. A collateralized debt obligation is a product structured by a bank in which an investor buys a share of a pool of bonds, loans, asset-backed securities, and other credit instruments. Payments resulting from those bonds, loans, asset-backed securities, and other instruments are then passed on to the holders of the shares of the collateralized debt obligation. It is a way to invest in multiple credit instruments and diversify risk. These instruments became popular before the 2008 financial crisis. There were 36 CDO-Squared deals made in 2005, 48 in 2006 and 41 in 2007. Merrill Lynch was a big producer, creating and selling 11 of them.

The collapse of the market for collateralized debt obligations and CDO-Squared contributed to the 2008 subprime mortgage crisis. Goldman Sachs appears to be the last bank to hold CDOs-Squared, holding $50 million (~$61.3 million in 2024) in June 2018.

== 2004 ==
- Abacus 2004-2
- Abacus 2004-3
- ACA 2004-1
- Cascade Funding I
- Crystal Cove
- Davis Square Funding III
- Dunhill
- E-Trade III
- Glacier Funding I
- Glacier Funding II
- Independence V
- Jupiter High Grade
- Lakeside II
- Sierra Madre Funding

== 2005 ==
- Abacus 2005-1
- Abacus 2005-2
- Abacus 2005-3
- Abacus 2005-5
- Adirondack 2005-1
- Altius I Funding
- Broderick 1
- Camber 3 Plc
- Class V Funding
- Coolidge Funding
- Davis Square Funding IV
- E-Trade IV
- Fort Sheridan
- Glacier Funding III
- G Street Finance
- Huntington
- Independence VI
- Jupiter High Grade I
- Jupiter High Grade II
- Jupiter High Grade III
- Khaleej II
- Kleros Preferred Funding
- Lenox
- Lexington Capital Funding

== 2006 ==
- Auriga
- Bernoulli High Grade I
- Broadwick Funding
- Broderick 2
- Class V Funding II
- Commodore V
- Davis Square Funding VI
- Fortius II Funding
- GSC 2006-2m
- Hout Bay 2006-1
- Hudson High Grade Funding 2006-1
- Hudson Mezzanine Funding 2006-1
- Independence VII
- Ipswich Street
- Jupiter High Grade IV
- Kleros Preferred Funding II
- Kleros Preferred Funding III
- Kleros Real Estate I
- Kleros Real Estate II
- Kleros Real Estate III
- Libertas Preferred Funding I
- Octans I
- Pampelonne I
- West Coast Funding I

== 2007 ==
- Abacus 2007-AC1
- Glacier Funding V
- Newbury Street
- Norma I
- Point Pleasant 2007-1
- Timberwolf 1
- Vertical 2007-1
- Volans

== Sources ==
- Adams, Andrew; Bhatt, Rajiv; Clunie, James (1 June 2009). "The Risks in CDO-Squared Structures" (PDF). Multinational Finance Journal. 13 (1/2): 55–74. doi:10.17578/13-1/2-3. ISSN 1096-1879.
