= Marshall Scholarship =

Postgraduate scholarship

- Awarded for: Americans to study for a graduate degree in the United Kingdom
- Sponsored by: Marshall Aid Commemoration Commission
- Established: 1953 by Parliament of the United Kingdom
- Website: marshallscholarship.org

The Marshall Scholarship is a postgraduate scholarship for "intellectually distinguished young Americans [and] their country's future leaders" to study at any university in the United Kingdom. It is considered among the most prestigious scholarships for U.S. citizens, and along with the Fulbright Scholarship, it is the only broadly available scholarship available to Americans to study at any university in the United Kingdom.

Created by the Parliament of the United Kingdom in 1953 as a living gift to the United States in recognition of the generosity of Secretary of State George C. Marshall and the Marshall Plan in the wake of World War II, the goal of the scholarship was to strengthen the Special Relationship between the two countries for "the good of mankind in this turbulent world". The scholarships are awarded by the Marshall Aid Commemoration Commission and are largely funded by the British government. The program was also the first major co-educational British graduate scholarship; one-third of the inaugural cohort in 1954 were women. With nearly 1,000 university-endorsed applicants in recent years—along with many more who apply but do not receive their university's endorsement—the Marshall Scholarship ranks among the most selective graduate scholarships for Americans. Among university-endorsed applicants, the acceptance rate typically ranges from three to four percent, reaching as low as 3.2 percent in 2015 and 3.6 percent for the 2025 class.

There are more than 1,900 Marshall Scholar alumni. Many of these alumni have achieved distinctions and hold prestigious careers. In the U.S. government, current alumni include an associate justice of the Supreme Court of the United States, members of Congress and presidential cabinets, and state governors. Alumni are CEOs of companies such as LinkedIn and Dolby Labs, and managing editors of Time magazine and CNN. They are also deans of Yale Law School, Stanford Law School, the Harvard Kennedy School, and Harvard College; and presidents of Duke University, Wellesley College, the Cooper Union, and Caltech. They also include two Nobel Laureates, a winner of the Kluge Prize, six Pulitzer Prize–winning authors, fourteen MacArthur Genius Grant awardees, NASA's youngest astronaut, two Oscar nominees, and one awardee of the Distinguished Flying Cross for service during the Iraq War.

== History ==
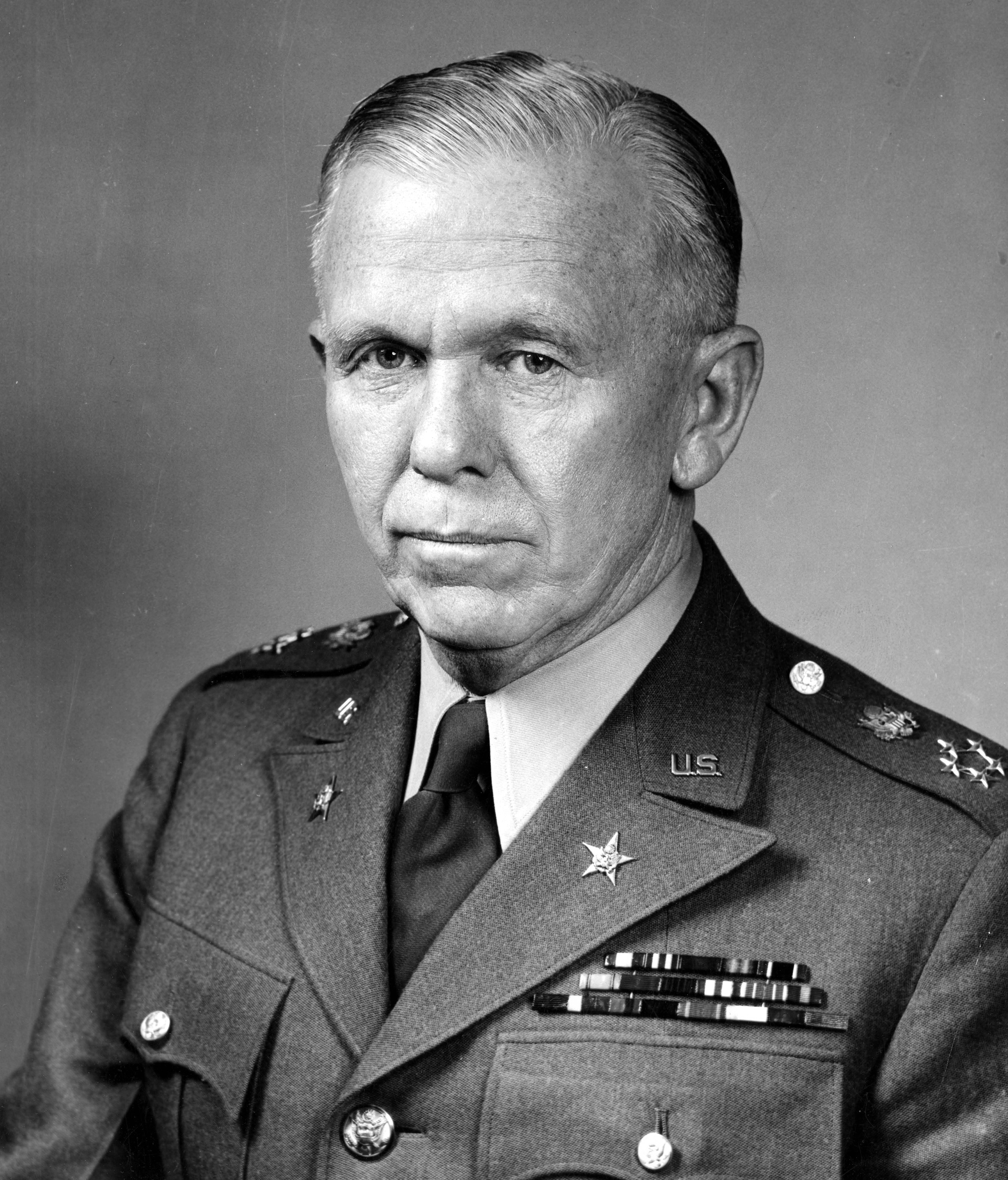
George C. Marshall, for whom the scholarships are named

=== Founding and motivation ===
Plans to establish Marshall Scholarships as a living memorial to United States secretary of state George C. Marshall was announced by British Foreign Secretary Anthony Eden on 31 July 1952. They were enacted by the Parliament of the United Kingdom with the Marshall Aid Commemoration Act 1953.

The authors of the proposal initially considered partnering with the Rhodes Scholarship and even considered using the same selection committees. This idea was eventually disregarded because its proponents strongly believed the scholarships should be available to women and to married men under the age of 28. At the time, the Rhodes Scholarship was limited to single men under the age of 25 and would remain such for two decades when, following the passage of the British Sex Discrimination Act in 1975, the Rhodes Scholarship became open to women beginning in 1977.

The creation of a separate scholarship was a cause of great concern to Lord Godfrey Elton, the head of the Rhodes Trust in 1952, who worried that the ability to study at other universities would draw potential applicants. He urged the Foreign Office to create a "reverse exchange" for British students to study in the United States instead.

In 1959, when Parliament doubled the number of Marshall scholars from 12 to 24, British politician Philip Noel-Baker argued that "Marshall, more than perhaps any other man, destroyed isolation in the United States and built up the conception that only collective security through international institutions can save the world... I think the world has never seen an act of greater national generosity than Marshall aid and the other aid which the United States has given to other continents throughout the last 15 years". By 1960, six years after its establishment, the scholarship was "on its way to becoming as well-known and respected as the fellow phrase, 'Rhodes [Scholarship]'", and both scholarships attracted roughly 500 to 600 applicants.

As part of the celebrations for the Fiftieth Anniversary of the Marshall Scholarships in 2003, a Marshall Medal was awarded to distinguished Americans in recognition of their contributions to UK-US relations, including Stephen Breyer (1959 Marshall Scholar), Ray Dolby (1957 Marshall Scholar), Thomas L. Friedman (1975 Marshall Scholar), and Nannerl Keohane (1961 Marshall Scholar).

In the early years of the Marshall Scholarship, it was common for new scholars to travel together to the UK on an ocean liner, but later, scholars usually are flown together to London from Washington, D.C. following a welcome program at the White House with top United Kingdom and United States government and diplomatic officials.

=== Evolution ===
In 1954, the first year Marshall Scholarships were awarded, 700 students applied, 74 were interviewed, and 12 were ultimately selected (eight men and four women). Two came from Stanford and the rest from Harvard, Princeton, Dartmouth, Bowdoin, Bryn Mawr, Oberlin, and the state universities of Kentucky, Utah, Virginia, and Wisconsin.

In 1956, Claremont McKenna student Hugh Gallagher became the first wheelchair user to be selected as a Marshall Scholar. He used the scholarship to study at Oxford. He went on to draft the Architectural Barriers Act of 1968, which required that buildings built with federal funds be made accessible to all and the law was enacted by President Lyndon B. Johnson. This was a precursor to the Americans With Disabilities Act of 1990. "Hugh's most outstanding contribution to the quality of life of people with disabilities was to successfully place disability rights on Congress' agenda for the first time", former Senate majority leader Bob Dole wrote for an event honoring Gallagher in 1995.

In 1963, Boston University graduate student John Willis became the first African American to be selected for a Marshall Scholarship. He used the scholarship to study at the School of Oriental and African Studies. Willis went on to being a professor emeritus of Near Eastern studies at Princeton University.

The number of scholars increased to thirty in 1973, forty in 1991, and 44 between 2004 and 2007. In 2010, the commission decided to offer a limited number of one-year awards. In 2016, the Foreign Office announced that forty scholars had been selected, a 25 percent increase more than the originally planned 32, with Foreign Office Minister Alok Sharma calling it a demonstration of how "resolute Britain is in its commitment to the special relationship".

On 7 June 2023, British Prime Minister Rishi Sunak, from his office at 10 Downing Street, announced an expansion to the funding allotted for Marshall Scholarships, writing in a press release that "the number of Marshall scholarships will increase by 25%, to 50 places a year". Accordingly, 51 students were selected as 2024 Marshall Scholars, the largest cohort in the 70-year history of the scholarship, however, only 36 students were selected the next year as 2025 Marshall Scholars.

== Objectives ==
In a letter to the first class of Marshall Scholars, George Marshall echoed his own words in initially presenting his ideas for European recovery by saying, "A close accord between our two countries is essential to the good of mankind in this turbulent world of today, and that is not possible without an intimate understanding of each other. These scholarships point the way to the continuation and growth of the understanding which found its necessity in the terrible struggle of the war years."

The published objectives of the Marshall Scholarships are outlined as follows:

1. "To enable intellectually distinguished young Americans, their country's future leaders, to study in the UK"
2. "To help scholars gain an understanding and appreciation of contemporary Britain"
3. "To contribute to the advancement of knowledge in science, technology, the humanities and social sciences, and the creative arts at Britain's centres of academic excellence"
4. "To motivate scholars to act as ambassadors from the U.S. to the UK and vice versa throughout their lives thus strengthening British American understanding"
5. "To promote the personal and academic fulfillment of each scholar"

== Selection ==
=== Selection criteria ===
The first proposed arrangement of the Marshall Scholarship, a ten-page 1953 document presented by the Secretary of State for Foreign Affairs to Parliament by Command of Her Majesty, instructed selectors to "look for distinction of intellect and character as evidenced both by their scholastic attainment and by other activities and achievements". It specified:

Preference will be given to candidates who combine high academic ability with the capacity to play an active part in the life of the United Kingdom university to which they go. A Marshall scholar, as the possessor of a keen intellect and a broad outlook, would be thought of as a person who would contribute to the aims General Marshall had in mind when, speaking at Cambridge, Massachusetts, on the 5th of June, 1947 of economic assistance for Europe, he said, "An essential part of any successful action on the part of the United States is an understanding on the part of the American people of the character of the problem and the remedies to be applied.

Political passion and prejudice should have no part. With foresight and the willingness on the part of our people to face up to the vast responsibilities which history has clearly placed upon our country, the difficulties... can and will be overcome."

Prospective applicants must first be endorsed by their universities to apply. The selection process is then coordinated through the eight major British embassy/consulate regions in the United States (Atlanta, Boston, Chicago, Houston, Los Angeles, New York, San Francisco, and Washington, D.C.). Selection committees in each region, consisting of former scholars and other distinguished individuals, receive university-endorsed applications (including personal statements and essays) that are used to select a short list of candidates for interviews. Each committee then interviews each of the regional finalists before making the final decisions on the year's awards. In 2014, sixteen percent of university-endorsed applicants received an interview.

Although most of the responsibility for selecting the recipients is in the hands of the committees, a few formal guidelines have been outlined in the official selection criteria, most notably:

As future leaders, with a lasting understanding of British society, Marshall Scholars will strengthen the enduring relationship between the British and American peoples, their governments, and their institutions. Marshall Scholars are talented, independent, and wide-ranging in their interests, and their time as Scholars will enhance their intellectual and personal growth. Their direct engagement with Britain through its best academic programmes will contribute to their ultimate personal success. In appointing Scholars the selectors will look for a distinction of intellect and character as evidenced both by their scholastic attainments and by their other activities and achievements. Preference will be given to candidates who display the potential to make a significant contribution to their own society. Selectors will also look for strong motivation and seriousness of purpose, including the presentation of a specific and realistic academic programme.

Between 900 and 1000 students typically are endorsed to apply for the Marshall Scholarship annually. In 2015 and 2016, 3.2 and 3.5 percent of university-endorsed applicants to the Marshall Scholarship were elected. In 2020, 1,000 students were endorsed, 160 interviewed, and 46 selected.

The Marshall selection committees place a strong emphasis on academic achievement and potential, and as such, the application requires a minimum grade point average of 3.7 GPA. Successful applicants, however, typically have much higher GPAs—more than half of applicants have perfect academic records. Winners from Harvard University have had average GPA of 3.92, and Stanford University recommends that applicants have a GPA of 3.8 or above.

Between 1954 and 2022, 256 of 2,179 the scholars received their undergraduate degrees from Harvard University (12 percent), 138 from Princeton University, 125 from Yale University, 94 from Stanford University, and 83 from the Massachusetts Institute of Technology. Among public universities, the top producers are the United States Military Academy, with 47 scholars, followed by the United States Naval Academy (34 scholars) and the University of California, Berkeley (33 scholars). The following table includes those institutions that have produced 30 or more scholars since 1954.

Institution	Scholars (1954–2022)
Harvard University and Radcliffe College	256
Princeton University	138
Yale University	125
Stanford University	94
Massachusetts Institute of Technology	83
Brown University and Pembroke College	51
United States Military Academy	47
Georgetown University	36
Cornell University	34
United States Naval Academy	34
University of California, Berkeley	33
Duke University	32
Columbia University and Barnard College	31

=== Scholarship terms ===
Marshall Scholars may study any full-time postgraduate course offered by a UK university excluding pre-professional programs, whether a taught master's program, a research degree, or a PhD. The basic tenure of the scholarship is two years. University and college fees are paid by the British government. In addition, scholars receive a quarterly maintenance stipend to cover accommodation and living expenses.

== Academic destinations ==
Nine institutions are traditionally the main destinations of selected Marshall Scholars: University of Oxford, University of Cambridge, London School of Economics, University College London, University of Edinburgh, King's College London, and Imperial College London. Sometimes SOAS and the London School of Hygiene & Tropical Medicine also have been highly preferred.

In 2015, there were 69 Marshall Scholars in residence at British universities including those who were selected for the classes of 2012, 2013, and 2014. During this time, there were 27 scholars at the University of Oxford, seventeen at the University of London (including five each at the London School of Economics and King's College London, and one at University College London), thirteen at the University of Cambridge, and four at Imperial College London. Of these scholars, 46 were studying arts and social sciences, while 23 were studying science, engineering, or mathematics.

== Comparison to other post-graduate scholarships ==
In structure and selection criteria, the Marshall Scholarship is most similar to the American Rhodes Scholarship and the Fulbright Program. Like the Fulbright that is available for study in the United Kingdom, Marshall Scholars may study at any university in the UK. However, under the Fulbright, applicants compete in separate pools for 43 specified universities of varying selectivity, except for two awards tenable at any university.

The Marshall Scholarship is more flexible than the Rhodes Scholarship, in that Marshall Scholars may study at any British university and also, may attend a different university each year during a Scholar's tenure. In addition, a limited number of one-year Marshall scholarships are available. Unlike Rhodes Scholars, Marshall Scholars must be American citizens (in comparison, approximately eighty Rhodes Scholarships are given annually to citizens of more than a dozen countries). In the process, the Marshall Scholarship is roughly as selective as the Rhodes and Mitchell Scholarships: the Marshall was awarded to 3.4 percent of university-endorsed applicants in 2014, compared to 3.7 percent for the Rhodes in 2014, and 3.2 percent for the Mitchell Scholarship in 2017. In 2025, the 3.66 percent of university-endorsed applicants received the Marshall, compared to 3.70 percent of university-endorsed applicants for the Rhodes. The Gates Cambridge Scholarship is slightly more selective, with 1.3% of applicants receiving an award. Also, because the selection processes of the scholarships discussed above differ, the likelihood that an applicant will be granted a final round interview is different for each scholarship. In 2014, 15.9 percent of university-endorsed applicants for the Marshall Scholarship received a finalist interview, compared to 24 percent of Rhodes applicants and 5.4 percent of Mitchell applicants.

While the selection committees continue to emphasize academic potential, over time "the Marshall program has become more Rhodes-like, stating that it is seeking persons who also demonstrate leadership potential". In general, "nearly all Rhodes Scholars are willing to admit that, by and large, the Marshalls are superior if one looks just at grade point averages and other signs of academic achievement", but this is a point of both "admiration" and "disdain". Walter Isaacson, describing Rhodes Scholars as "fairly intelligent, well-rounded, honest people who could be counted on to be upstanding citizens", has said that "the real geniuses... were the Marshall Scholars", perhaps because of the expectation that Rhodes Scholars be "all-rounders". In practice, the Marshall and Rhodes have engaged an "informal rivalry", but in career trajectory after the completion of their fellowships, "the line between [the fellowships] is not so evident", with scholars pursuing similar fields with similar success. In general, a higher percentage of Marshall Scholars "go on to careers in academia and research, whereas Rhodes Scholars are more evenly scattered through the full range of professional occupations".

== Association of Marshall Scholars ==
The Association of Marshall Scholars (AMS) was formed in 1988 as a charitable organization.

The organization has been led by several notable board and advisory members, including Kathleen Sullivan, Reid Hoffman, Nannerl Keohane, Peter Orszag, Harold Koh, Roger Tsien, and Daniel Yergin.

The Association of Marshall Scholars releases an annual public opinion poll in partnership with Emerson College in Boston, Massachusetts. The poll measures perceptions of the United Kingdom by the American public, highlighting major current issues (e.g. Brexit).

=== The Marshall Forum ===
Every year, the Association of Marshall Scholars hosts the Marshall Forum in a different city. It is a high-profile dialogue engaging top American and British leaders about key transatlantic issues. During Forums that take place during anniversaries of the Scholarship or the Marshall Plan, the Marshall Medal typically is awarded to distinguished individuals who have advanced British-American understanding. These have included Lisa Cook (1986 Marshall Scholar), Madeleine Albright, and Anne Applebaum (1986 Marshall Scholar).

In partnership with the German Marshall Fund and the British Embassy, Washington in 2017, the Association of Marshall Scholars hosted the Harvard Marshall Forum at Harvard University to mark the seventieth anniversary of the Marshall Plan and focused on its legacy and effect today. The event featured 30 speakers including Madeleine Albright as well as two Marshall Scholars, Supreme Court Justices Stephen Breyer and Neil Gorsuch.

In 2018, the association partnered with the British Consulate General in San Francisco and the Bechtel International Center at Stanford University to host a Marshall Forum on Innovation. The Forum focused on the pipeline of scientific invention in fields that are of particular interest to the United States and the United Kingdom, such as biomedicine and genetics. Distinguished speakers included Reid Hoffman, a Marshall Scholar, and David Reitze, Director of LIGO Laboratory. The forum highlighted societal challenges and opportunities raised by explosive innovations in these fields as they interact with advances in machine learning, artificial intelligence, and data science.

In 2019, the association hosted the Marshall Forum with the Carnegie Endowment for International Peace, focusing on peace and prosperity. The Forum featured 17 speakers including the Governor of the Bank of England Mark Carney, the Director of U.S. National Security Agency General Paul Nakasone, former U.S. ambassadors Michael Froman, Carla Hills, and William J. Burns, and former British Ambassador to the United States Kim Darroch.

Year	City	Hosting Institution	Topic	Notable Speakers and Facilitators
2026	Palo Alto, California	Stanford University	Artificial Intelligence	Maher Bitar (Marshall Scholar 2006), Tarun Chhabra (Marshall Scholar 2005), David Engstrom, Thomas L. Friedman (Marshall Scholar 1975), Reid Hoffman (Marshall Scholar 1990), James Manyika, Nathaniel Persily, Kanjun Qiu, George Triantis, Tim Wu
2025	Oxford, United Kingdom and London, United Kingdom	Supreme Court of the United Kingdom and All Souls College, Oxford	The Rule of Law	Sherry Coutu CBE, Stephen Quake (Marshall Scholar 1991), Sir Jeremy Farrar OBE (Wellcome), Daniel Yergin (Marshall Scholar 1968), Harold Hongju Koh (Marshall Scholar 1975), The Hon. Stuart Levey, Karin Von Hippel, Thomas Friedman OBE (Marshall Scholar 1975), Greg Miller, Meena Seshamani (Marshall Scholar 1999), The Hon. Chuck Hagel, Megan Smith (Marshall Scholar 1975), Reid Hoffman (Marshall Scholar 1990), Vijay Rangarajan, Vicky Ford MP, Stephen Lovegrove, William J. Burns (Marshall Scholar 1978) Gina Raimondo
2024	Chicago, Illinois	University of Chicago	Global Markets, Monetary Policy, and Innovation	Amir Sufi, Luigi Zingales, Bill Janeway CBE (Marshall Scholar 1965), James Poterba (Marshall Scholar 1979), David Leonhardt, Austan Goolsbee, Peter Orszag (Marshall Scholar 1991), Katie Beirne Fallon (Marshall Scholar 1998), Alex Oshmyansky (Marshall Scholar 2005), Meena Seshamani (Marshall Scholar 1999) Rachel Glennerster, John Hewko (1979)
2023	Washington, D.C.	Planet Word Museum	Arts & Creativity	Jonathan Galassi (Marshall Scholar 1971), Sarah Stillman (Marshall Scholar 2012)
2022	London, United Kingdom	Lancaster House	Global Peace and Security (75th anniversary of the Marshall Plan)	Sherry Coutu CBE, Stephen Quake (Marshall Scholar 1991), Sir Jeremy Farrar OBE (Wellcome), Daniel Yergin (Marshall Scholar 1968), Harold Hongju Koh (Marshall Scholar 1975), The Hon. Stuart Levey, Karin Von Hippel, Thomas Friedman OBE (Marshall Scholar 1975), Greg Miller, Meena Seshamani (Marshall Scholar 1999), The Hon. Chuck Hagel, Megan Smith (Marshall Scholar 1975), Reid Hoffman (Marshall Scholar 1990), Vijay Rangarajan, Vicky Ford MP, Stephen Lovegrove, William J. Burns (Marshall Scholar 1978) Gina Raimondo
2021	Washington, D.C.	U.S. Supreme Court	The Rule of Law	US Supreme Court: John Roberts, Stephen Breyer (Marshall Scholar 1959), Sonia Sotomayor, Elena Kagan, Neil Gorsuch (Marshall Scholar 1992), Brett Kavanaugh UK Supreme Court: Patrick Hodge, Michael Briggs, Mary Arden, Jonathan Mance
2020	Online due to the COVID-19 pandemic	Virtual Platform	Global Health	Danielle Allen (Marshall Scholar 1993), Andy Burnham, Kevin L. Faulconer, Kate Gallego, David Holt, Sewell Chan (Marshall Scholar 1998), Tom Fletcher
2019	Washington, D.C.	The Carnegie Endowment for International Peace	Peace, Growth, and Prosperity	Kim Darroch, Mark Carney, Thomas Carothers (1978 Marshall Scholar), Isobel Coleman (1987 Marshall Scholar), Michael Froman, William J. Burns (1978 Marshall Scholar), Paul Nakasone, Andrew Klaber (2003 Marshall Scholar)
2018	Palo Alto, California	Stanford University	Scientific Innovation	Reid Hoffman (1990 Marshall Scholar), Carla Shatz (1969 Marshall Scholar), Nancy Lublin (1993 Marshall Scholar), Carlos Bustamante, Edward Stolper (1974 Marshall Scholar)
2017	Cambridge, Massachusetts	Harvard University	"The Legacy of the Marshall Plan" (70th anniversary of the Marshall Plan)	Stephen Breyer (1959 Marshall Scholar), Neil Gorsuch (1992 Marshall Scholar), Madeleine Albright, Danielle Allen (1993 Marshall Scholar), William J. Burns (1978 Marshall Scholar), Fredrik Logevall, Martha Minow, Kathleen Sullivan

== Notable Marshall Scholars ==
Name	Prior Higher Education	Constituent University	Award Year	Notability
Anthony C. E. Quainton	Princeton University	University of Oxford	1955	Ambassador to Nicaragua, Kuwait, Peru, and Central African Empire
Thomas Eugene Everhart	Harvard University	University of Cambridge	1955	president, California Institute of Technology; chancellor, University of Illinois at Urbana-Champaign
Ray Dolby	Stanford University	University of Cambridge	1957	inventor and chairman of Dolby
Arthur Jaffe	Princeton University	University of Cambridge	1959	L.T. Clay Professor of Mathematics and Theoretical Science, Harvard University
John Jay Iselin	Harvard University	University of Cambridge	1959	president of Cooper Union, president of WNET
Stephen Breyer	Stanford University	University of Oxford	1959	associate justice, U.S. Supreme Court
Bruce Babbitt	University of Notre Dame	Newcastle University	1960	Governor of Arizona, U.S. Secretary of the Interior
Keith Griffin	Williams College	University of Oxford	1960	president of Magdalen College, University of Oxford
Nannerl Keohane	Wellesley College	University of Oxford	1961	president Duke University and Wellesley College
Ed Victor	Dartmouth College	University of Cambridge	1961	journalist and literary agent
Graham Allison	Harvard University	University of Oxford	1962	foreign policy expert, Undersecretary of Defense
Thomas C. Grey	Stanford University	University of Oxford	1963	professor of law, Stanford University
Thomas Babe	Harvard University	University of Cambridge	1963	playwright
Stuart Kauffman	Dartmouth College	University of Oxford	1963	founder, Elizabeth Kauffman Institute for Transforming Medicine
Alfred Guzzetti	Harvard University	University of London	1964	experimental and documentary filmmaker
John Spratt	Davidson College	University of Oxford	1964	U.S. Congress for South Carolina
William H. Janeway	Princeton University	University of Cambridge	1965	venture capitalist and economist
Lewis Sargentich	Occidental College	Sussex University	1965	professor, Harvard Law School
Benjamin M. Friedman	Harvard University	University of Cambridge	1966	political economist
William Broyles Jr.	Rice University	University of Oxford	1966	screenwriter
Daniel Yergin	Yale University	University of Cambridge	1968	Pulitzer Prize-winning author
Jerry A. Hausman	Brown University	University of Oxford	1968	professor of economics, Massachusetts Institute of Technology
Robert Oden	Harvard University	University of Cambridge	1969	president, Carleton College and Kenyon College
Peter Kramer	Harvard University	University College, London	1970	author
Nancy Cox	Iowa State University	University of Cambridge	1970	director of the influenza division, Center for Disease Control and Prevention
Jonathan Galassi	Harvard College	University of Cambridge	1971	president, Farrar, Straus and Giroux
Marty Kaplan	Harvard University	University of Cambridge	1971	director, Norman Lear Center
Odaline de la Martinez	Tulane University	Royal Academy of Music	1972	Cuban-American composer
Roger Tsien	Harvard University	University of Cambridge	1972	Nobel Prize in Chemistry
Benedict Gross	Harvard University	University of Oxford	1973	professor of mathematics known for the Gross–Zagier theorem
James K. Galbraith	Harvard University	University of Cambridge	1974	economist and journalist
William A. Darity Jr.	Brown University	London School of Economics	1974	economist, professor of public policy at Duke University
Douglas A. Melton	University of Illinois Urbana-Champaign	University of Cambridge	1975	chair, Harvard University department of stem cell and regenerative biology
Thomas Friedman	Brandeis University	University of Oxford	1975	journalist, author, three time Pulitzer Prize winner
Harold Koh	Harvard University	University of Oxford	1975	former dean, Yale Law School
Amy Wax	Yale University	University of Oxford	1976	professor of law, University of Pennsylvania Law School
Jane M. Hawkins	College of the Holy Cross	University of Warwick	1976	mathematician, University of North Carolina at Chapel Hill
Kathleen Sullivan	Cornell University	University of Oxford	1976	professor, Stanford Law School
Paul Tash	Indiana University	University of Edinburgh	1976	CEO of Times Publishing Company
Jef McAllister	Yale University	University of Oxford	1977	former London Bureau chief of TIME
Bill Buford	University of California, Berkeley	University of Cambridge	1977	founding editor of Granta
Edward Hundert	Yale University	University of Oxford	1978	educator, psychiatrist, and medical ethicist
William J. Burns	La Salle University	University of Oxford	1978	Director of the Central Intelligence Agency, U.S. ambassador to Russia
Jeff Modisett	University of California, Los Angeles	University of Oxford	1978	Indiana Attorney General
Thomas Carothers	Harvard University	London School of Economics	1978	vice president for studies at Carnegie Endowment for International Peace
Mark Whitaker	Harvard University	University of Oxford	1979	managing editor of CNN Worldwide, senior vice president of NBC News, editor of Newsweek
Arthur L. Haywood III	Morehouse College	London School of Economics	1979	Pennsylvania State Senator
Jeffrey Rosensweig	Yale University	University of Oxford	1979	Director of Global Perspectives, Emory University
Bruce Allen	Massachusetts Institute of Technology	University of Cambridge	1980	director, Max Planck Institute for Gravitational Physics
Kurt M. Campbell	University of California, San Diego	University of Oxford	1980	U.S. Deputy Secretary of State, National Security Council coordinator for the Indo-Pacific
Steven Strogatz	Princeton University	University of Cambridge	1980	applied mathematician (Complex Networks)
James M. Poterba	Harvard University	University of Oxford	1980	professor of economics, Massachusetts Institute of Technology
Richard Cordray	Michigan State University	University of Oxford	1981	director, Consumer Financial Protection Bureau
D. Cameron Findlay	Northwestern University	University of Oxford	1982	former U.S. Deputy Secretary of Labor
Nancy Gibbs	Yale University	University of Oxford	1982	managing editor of Time
Seth Lloyd	Harvard University	University of Cambridge	1982	quantum information scientist
Ted Conover	Amherst College	University of Cambridge	1982	author, essayist and journalist
Daniel Benjamin	Harvard University	University of Oxford	1983	Ambassador at Large, U.S. State Department
Matthew Adler	Yale University	University of Oxford	1984	founding director of the Duke University Center for Law, Economics and Public Policy
Michael Klarman	University of Pennsylvania	University of Oxford	1984	Constitutional law scholar, Harvard Law School
Sheryll D. Cashin	Vanderbilt University	University of Oxford	1984	law professor, Georgetown University
Michael Otsuka	Yale University	University of Oxford	1986	professor, London School of Economics
Anne Applebaum	Yale University	London School of Economics	1986	The Washington Post columnist, Pulitzer Prize winner
Jeffrey Rosen	Harvard University	University of Oxford	1986	law professor and legal affairs editor at The New Republic
Terri Sewell	Princeton University	University of Oxford	1987	U.S. Congress for Alabama
David Laibson	Harvard University	London School of Economics	1988	professor of economics, Harvard University
Melissa Lane	Harvard University	University of Cambridge	1988	professor of political theory, Princeton University
Kris Kobach	Harvard University	University of Oxford	1988	Secretary of State of Kansas, national rowing champion
Mark Filip	University of Illinois, Urbana-Champaign	University of Oxford	1988	former U.S. Deputy Attorney General
Patrick M. Byrne	Dartmouth College	University of Cambridge	1988	chairman and president, Overstock.com
Heather J. Sharkey	Yale University	Durham University	1990	professor of near eastern languages and civilizations, University of Pennsylvania
Charles King	University of Arkansas	University of Oxford	1990	author and professor at Georgetown University
Peter R. Orszag	Princeton University	London School of Economics	1991	CEO, Lazard
Stephen Quake	Stanford University	University of Oxford	1991	professor of bioengineering at Stanford University
Rosa Brooks	Harvard University	University of Oxford	1991	Los Angeles Times columnist, Georgetown University law professor
Timothy D. Snyder	Brown University	University of Oxford	1991	professor of history, Yale University
Jeremy Heyl	Princeton University	Durham University, Cambridge University	1992	professor of physics and astronomy, University of British Columbia
Angela Duckworth	Harvard College	University of Oxford	1992	head of Duckworth Lab, University of Pennsylvania
Kelly Grovier	University of California, Los Angeles	University of Oxford	1992	poet and literary critic
Neil Gorsuch	Columbia University	University of Oxford	1992	associate justice, U.S. Supreme Court
Annabel Park	Boston University	University of Oxford	1992	documentary filmmaker
Nancy Lublin	Brown University	University of Oxford	1993	founder of Dress For Success; CEO, DoSomething
Danielle Allen	Princeton University	University of Cambridge	1993	director, Harvard Edmond J. Safra Center for Ethics
Kannon Shanmugam	Harvard University	University of Oxford	1993	Supreme Court litigator
Ahilan Arulanantham	Georgetown University	University of Oxford	1994	human rights attorney
Jeffrey Gettleman	Cornell University	University of Oxford	1994	Pulitzer Prize winning author, journalist
Jennifer Daskal	Brown University	University of Cambridge	1994	former counsel, Department of Justice
Amy Finkelstein	Harvard University	University of Oxford	1995	professor at MIT
Jason Bordoff	Brown University	University of Oxford	1995	National Security Council
Nicole Krauss	Stanford University	University of Oxford	1996	novelist
Mark Hersam	University of Illinois Urbana-Champaign	University of Cambridge	1996	professor of chemistry, Northwestern University
Jonathan Orszag	Princeton University	University of Oxford	1996	senior managing director of Compass Lexecon, Clinton Administration Economic Advisor
A. Benjamin Spencer	Morehouse College	London School of Economics	1996	Dean & Trustee Professor, William & Mary Law School
Derek Kilmer	Princeton University	University of Oxford	1996	U.S. Congressman for Washington
Samuel Rascoff	Harvard University	University of Oxford	1996	professor, New York University School of Law
Joshua Oppenheimer	Harvard University	University of the Arts London	1997	award-winning documentary film director
Robert Lane Greene	Tulane University	University of Oxford	1997	journalist
Kim Campbell	U.S. Air Force Academy	Imperial College, London	1997	U.S. Air Force pilot, Distinguished Flying Cross recipient
Katie Beirne Fallon	University of Notre Dame	Queens University Belfast; London School of Economics	1998	former legislative affairs Director, White House
Sewell Chan	Harvard University	University of Oxford	1998	journalist
Warwick Sabin	University of Arkansas	University of Oxford	1998	former Member, Arkansas House of Representatives
Dan Klein	Cornell University	University of Oxford	1998	professor computer science, University of California, Berkeley
Josh West	Yale University	University of Cambridge	1999	professor of earth sciences, University of Southern California, 2008 Summer Olympics for Great Britain
Matthew Spence	Stanford University	University of Oxford	2000	deputy assistant secretary of defense for Middle East policy
Zachary D. Kaufman	Yale University	University of Oxford	2000	legal academic and social entrepreneur
Adam Cohen	Harvard University	University of Cambridge	2001	professor of chemistry, Harvard University
Krish O'Mara Vignarajah	Yale University	University of Oxford	2001	president & CEO, Global Refuge
Anne McClain	U.S. military academy	University of Bath and University of Bristol	2002	Colonel, U.S. Army, NASA astronaut
Andrew Klaber	Yale University, Harvard University	University of Oxford	2004	Partner at Paulson & Company
Scott MacIntyre	Arizona State University	Royal Holloway, University of London, Royal College of Music	2005	musician, American Idol season 8 contestant
Finale Doshi-Velez	Massachusetts Institute of Technology	University of Cambridge (Trinity College)	2007	Computer scientist
Marc Gustafson	New York University	University of Oxford	2007	Director of the White House Situation Room and Intelligence Advisor to President Biden
John M. Jumper	Vanderbilt University	University of Cambridge (St. Edmund's College)	2007	Nobel Prize in Chemistry
Tianhui Michael Li	Princeton University	University of Cambridge	2007	first data scientist in residence at Andreessen Horowitz
Miles Taylor	Indiana University	University of Oxford	2012	National security expert, author, former DHS chief of staff
R. F. Kuang	Georgetown University	University of Cambridge, University of Oxford	2018	Fantasy novelist, historian

== See also ==
- Churchill Scholarship at University of Cambridge
- Fulbright Scholarship
- Gates Cambridge Scholarship at University of Cambridge
- Harry S. Truman Scholarship
- Knight-Hennessy Scholarship at Stanford University
- Mitchell Scholarship at universities in the Republic of Ireland and Northern Ireland
- Rhodes Scholarship at University of Oxford
- Schwarzman Scholarship at Tsinghua University
- Yenching Scholars at Peking University
- Jardine Scholarship at University of Oxford and University of Cambridge
- Erasmus Mundus Scholarship at universities in the European Union and their non-EU partners
