= Henry Hadley =

Henry Hadley may refer to:

- Henry Kimball Hadley (1871–1937), American composer and conductor
- Henry Hadley (died 1914) (1863–1914), English civilian, the "first British casualty" of World War I
- Henry Hamilton Hadley (1826–1864), American theologian
- Red Hadley (Henry Hadley), Negro league baseball player
