= James Hadley (scholar) =

United States classical philologist (1821–1872)

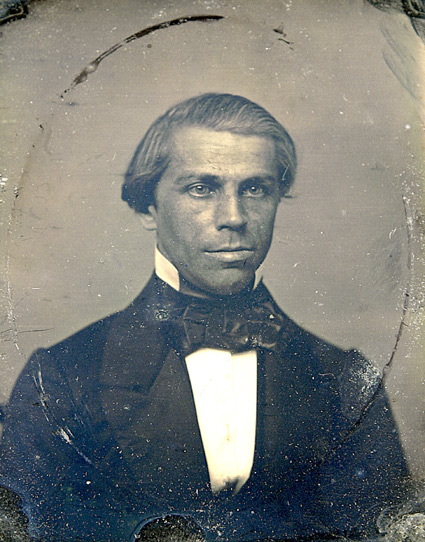
- Daguerreotype of Hadley, c. 1850
- Born: March 30, 1821; Fairfield, New York
- Died: November 14, 1872 (aged 51); New Haven, Connecticut
- Education: Yale College
- Occupations: Philologist, professor
- Employer: Yale College
- Spouse: Anne Loring Twining
- Children: Arthur Twining Hadley

James Hadley (March 30, 1821 – November 14, 1872) was an American philologist who taught Greek and Hebrew languages at Yale College.

== Biography ==
Hadley was born in Fairfield, New York, where his father was professor of chemistry at Fairfield Medical College. At the age of nine, a knee injury left him crippled for life. Hadley received his early instruction at the Fairfield Academy, and also acquired some scientific knowledge from his father. He became assistant at the academy, and later graduated from Yale College in 1842, having entered the junior class in 1840. Hadley was then a resident graduate at Yale for a year, after which he entered Yale's theological seminary, where he spent two years.

From April to September 1845, Hadley was a tutor at Middlebury College. He was a tutor at Yale in 1845–1848, an assistant professor of Greek in 1848–1851, and a professor of Greek, succeeding President Woolsey, from 1851 until his death in New Haven, Connecticut.

As an undergraduate, Hadley had proven an able mathematician, but the influence of Edward Elbridge Salisbury, under whom Hadley and William Dwight Whitney studied Sanskrit together, turned his attention toward the study of language. He knew Greek, Latin, Sanskrit, Hebrew, Arabic, Armenian, several Celtic languages, and the languages of modern Europe; but he published little, and his scholarship found scant outlet in the college classroom.

Hadley was well versed in civil law. His course of lectures on civil law was included in the curriculum of the Yale Law School, and was likewise delivered at Harvard. Hadley was a member of the American Committee for the revision of the New Testament, and was president of the American Oriental Society (1871–1872).

== Work ==
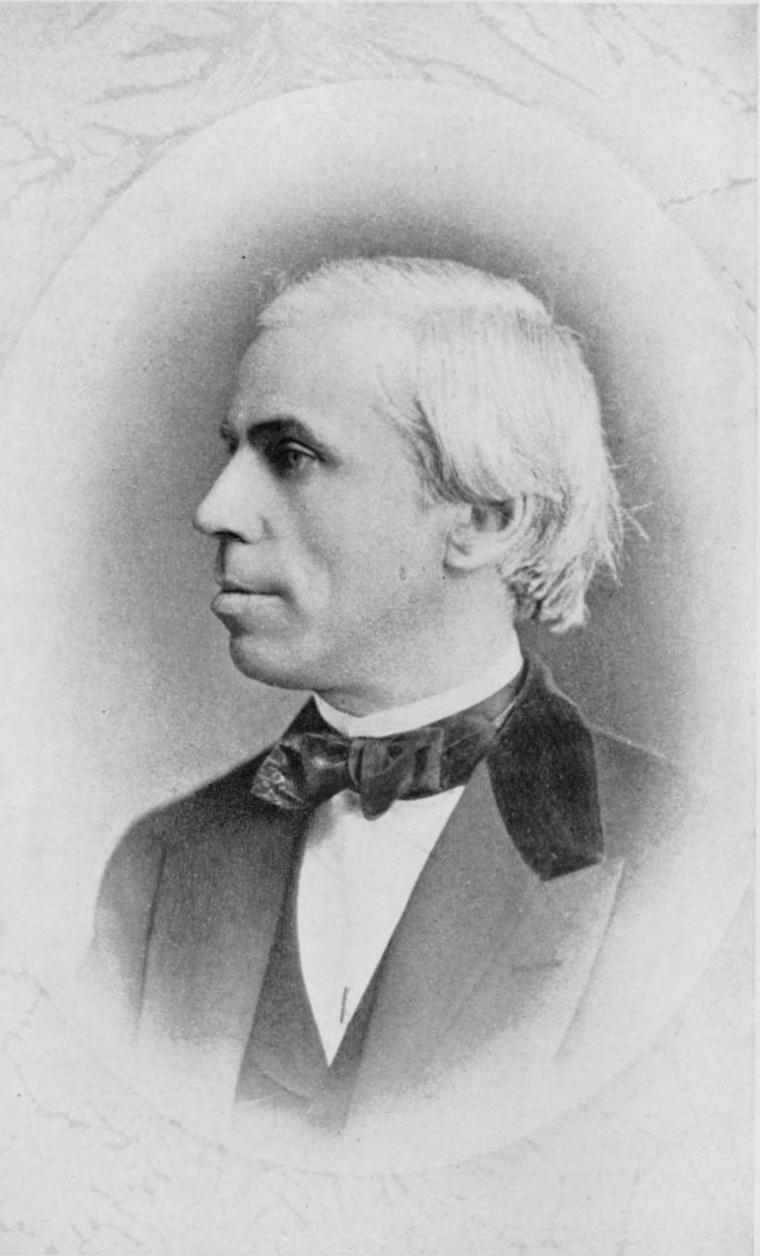
Portrait of Hadley

Hadley's most original written work was an essay on Greek accent, published in a German version in Georg Curtius's Sprachvergleichende Beiträge zur griechischen und lateinischen Grammatik. Hadley's A Greek Grammar for Schools and Colleges (New York, 1860; revised by Frederic de Forest Allen, 1884) was based on Curtius's Schulgrammatik (1852, 1855, 1857, 1859), and long held its place in American schools. Hadley contributed to Webster's Dictionary a Brief History of the English Language (Springfield, 1864). He also wrote Elements of the Greek Language (New York, 1869). In 1873, after his death, his Introduction to Roman Law (twelve lectures; New York, edited by T.D. Woolsey) and his Essays, Philological and Critical (twenty altogether; New York, edited by William D. Whitney) were published.

In 1951, Hadley's diary from 1846 to 1852 was published by Yale University Press.

== Family ==
On August 13, 1851, Hadley married Anne Loring Twining, the daughter of Stephen Twining and his wife, née Almira Catlin. They became the parents of Arthur Twining Hadley, president of Yale University from 1899 to 1921.

James Hadley's brother, Henry Hamilton Hadley (born in Fairfield July 19, 1826; died in Washington, D.C., August 1, 1864) was a noted educator. Henry graduated at Yale in 1845. He then held the office of tutor for two years, and studied theology, finally completing his course at Andover in 1853. He then spent some time in New York studying law, but returned to New Haven, and there spent more than three years in theological pursuits, especially in a systematic study of the Hebrew language and the Old Testament scriptures. In 1858, Henry became instructor of sacred literature in Union Theological Seminary, New York, and professor of Hebrew there in 1862. During 1861, he held the professorship of Hebrew in the theological department of Yale. At the beginning of the American Civil War, Henry was prevented by his friends from enlisting in the Union Army, but paid for two substitutes. During the summer vacation of 1864, he offered his time for the work of the United States Sanitary Commission, and was sent to City Point, Virginia, where he died. Henry published articles in the American Theological Review.
