= Jonathan Taylor (academic administrator) =

English academic admin (born 1935)

Jonathan Francis Taylor CBE (born 12 August 1935) is the former Chair of the School of Oriental and African Studies (University of London), Board of Governors, Chairman of the Booker Prize Foundation, the Marshall Aid Commemoration Commission and Chair of the Trustees of the International Prize for Arabic Fiction.

Taylor is a graduate and Fellow of Corpus Christi College, Oxford. He became chair of the Booker Prize Foundation in 2001, having joined Booker plc in 1959 and served as its chief executive from 1984 to 1993. He was a member of the School of Oriental and African Studies (SOAS) Governing Body from 1988 to 2005, and in 2010 was awarded an Honorary Fellowship for his distinguished service to the School. He was a founder and first chair the Caine Prize for African Writing.
