= Arthur Twining Hadley =

American college president (1856–1930)

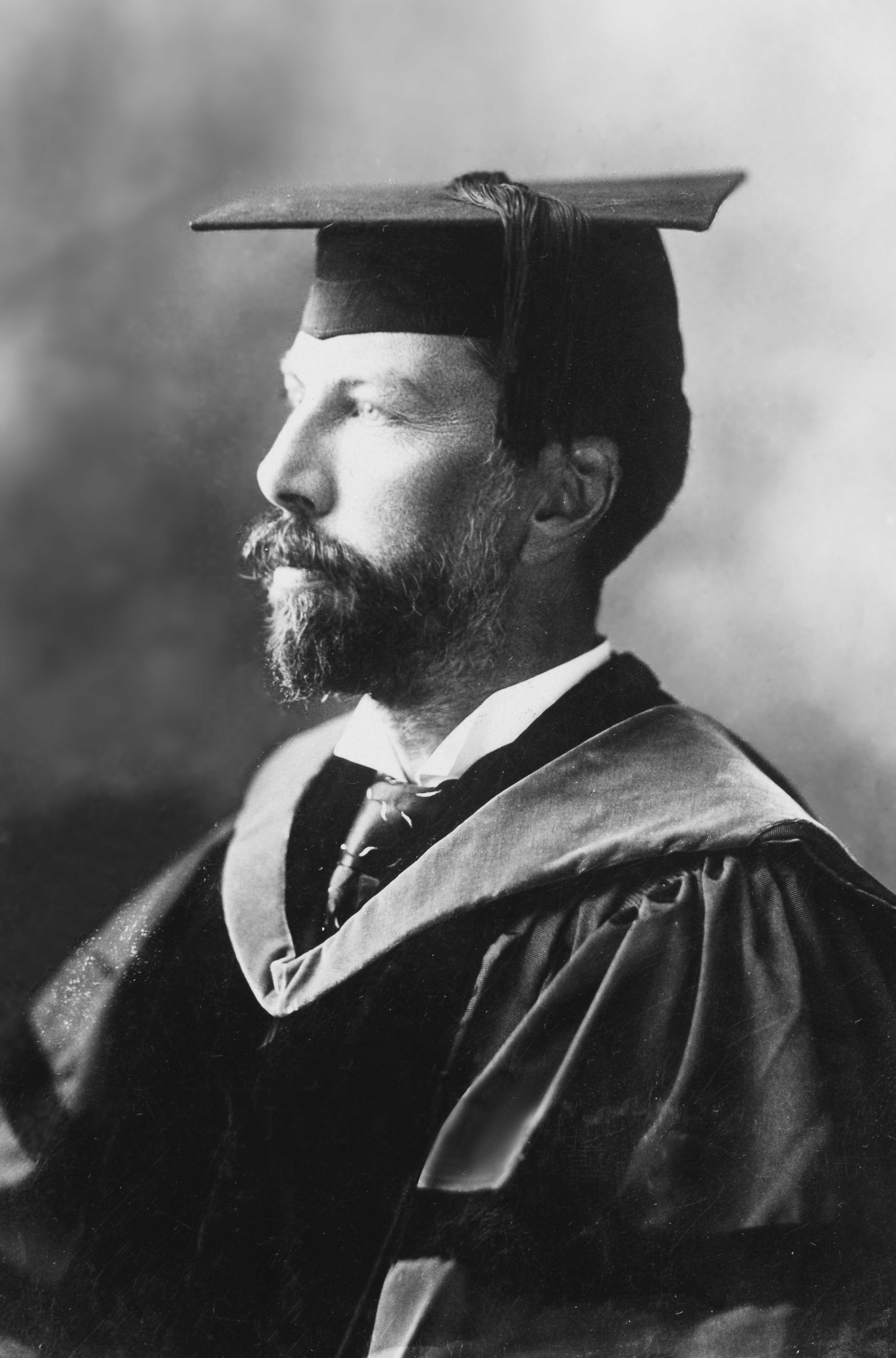

13th President of Yale University
- In office 1899–1921
- Preceded by: Timothy Dwight V
- Succeeded by: James Rowland Angell

Personal details
- Born: April 23, 1856 New Haven, Connecticut, U.S.
- Died: March 6, 1930 (aged 73) Kobe Harbor, Japan
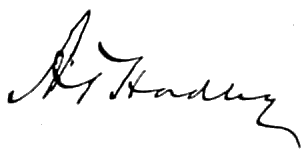
- Signature

Arthur Twining Hadley (/ˈhædliː/, HAD-lee; April 23, 1856 – March 6, 1930) was an American economist who served as President of Yale University from 1899 to 1921.

== Biography ==
Hadley was born in New Haven, Connecticut, the son of James Hadley, Professor of Greek at Yale 1851–1872, and his wife, née Anne Loring Morris. He graduated from Yale College in 1876, where he was a member of DKE and Skull and Bones, and received prizes in English, classics and astronomy. He then studied political science at Yale (1876–1877), and at the University of Berlin (1878–1879) under Adolph Wagner. He was a tutor at Yale in 1879–1883, instructor in political science in 1883–1886, professor of political science in 1886–1891, professor of political economy in 1891–1899, and first Dean of the Graduate School in 1892–1895. His course in economics became a favorite of undergraduates, and he wrote a classic study of the economics of railroad transportation. He became president of Yale in 1899—the first president who was not a minister—and guided it through a period of expansion and consolidation.

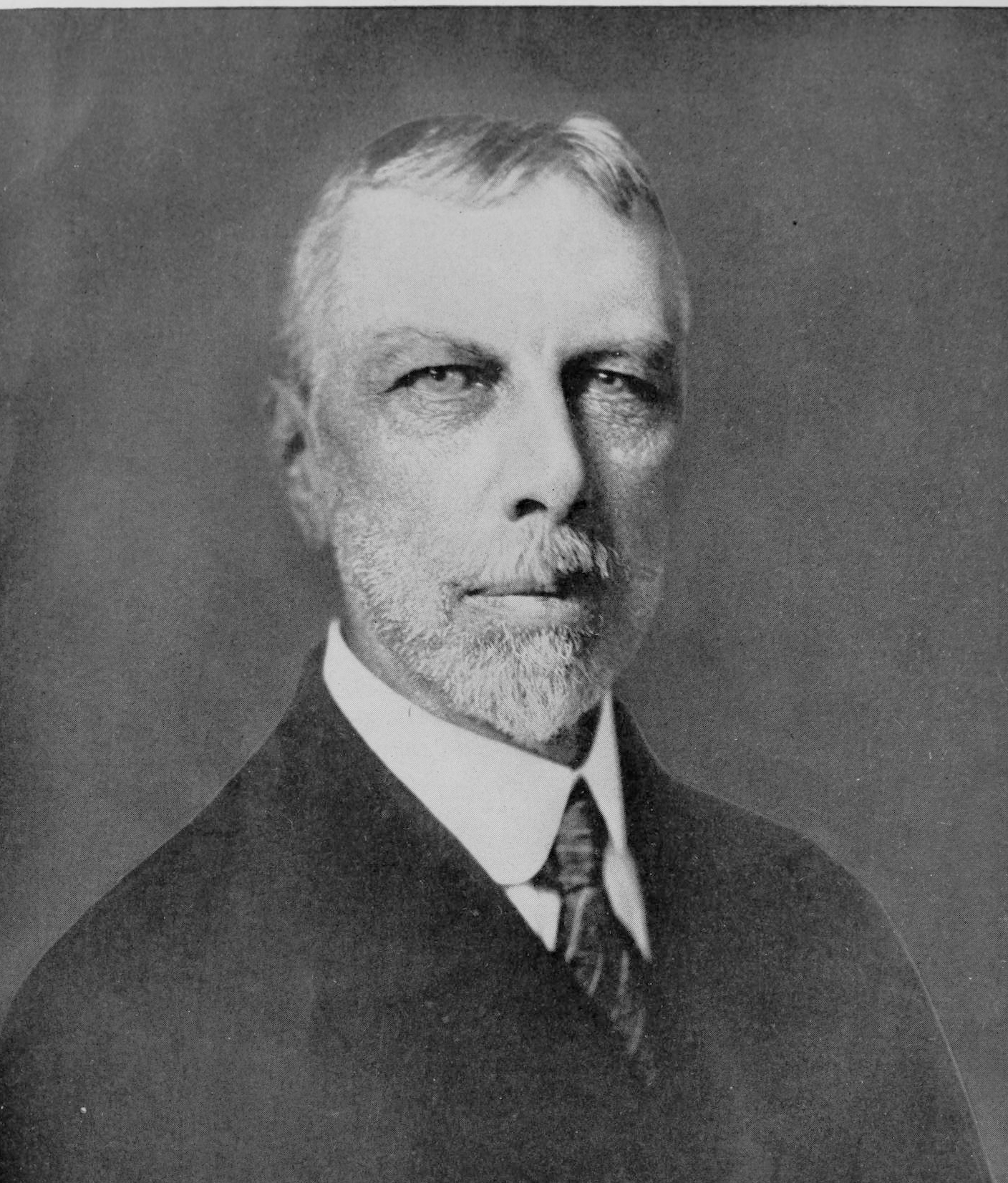
c. 1920

He was commissioner of the Connecticut bureau of labor statistics in 1885–1887. As an economist he first became widely known through his investigation of the railway question and his study of railway rates, which antedated the popular excitement as to rebates. His Railroad Transportation, Its History and Laws (1885) became a standard work, and appeared in Russian (1886) and French (1887). He testified as an expert on transportation before the Senate committee which drew up the Interstate Commerce Law, and wrote on railways and transportation for the Ninth and Tenth Editions (of which he was one of the editors) of the Encyclopædia Britannica. He wrote for Lalor's Cyclopaedia of Political Science, Political Economy, and the Political History of the United States (3 vols., 1881–1884), for The American Railway (1888), and for The Railroad Gazette in 1884–1891, and for other periodicals. His idea of the broad scope of economic science, especially of the place of ethics in relation to political economy and business, is expressed in his writings and public addresses. In 1907–1908 he was Theodore Roosevelt Professor of American History and Institutions at Frederick William University. In 1902, he was elected as a member to the American Philosophical Society. He was an early member of the American Academy of Arts and Letters.

He was elected a director of the New York, New Haven and Hartford Railroad in 1913. In 1914 he lectured at the University of Oxford on “Institutions of the United States.” In 1915 he evoked considerable discussion in the United States by declaring that young men who looked forward to a political career should have private means so as to avoid pecuniary temptations. In 1915 he endorsed college military camps and favored counting military training for a degree.

After his retirement, he and his wife went on a world cruise, visiting Europe, India, and China. As the ship was approaching Japan, Hadley contracted pneumonia and died on shipboard, and the body was prepared in Japan for return to New Haven and interment in Grove Street Cemetery. When the coffin was opened prior to burial, Hadley was clothed in a yellow Japanese kimono with a samurai sword placed alongside.

Grove Street Cemetery's Egyptian Revival gateway is inscribed The Dead Shall Be Raised, and most Yale presidents since it was built—and Hadley was no exception—have at some point quipped that the dead would most certainly be raised if Yale needs the land. Most are now buried there.

== Works ==
In his books, he endeavored to utilize the results of economic and political history as a basis for a working system of ethics for a democracy like that of the United States. Among his works are:

- Railroad Transportation, Its History and Laws (see notice above; 1885)
- Report on the Labor Question (1885)
- Economics, an Account of the Relations between Private Property and Public Welfare (1896)
- The Education of the American Citizen (1901)
- Freedom and Responsibility (1903)
- Baccalaureate Addresses (1907)
- Standards of Public Morality (1907)
- Some Influences in Modern Philosophic Thought (1913)
- Undercurrents in American Politics (1915)
- The Moral Basis of Democracy (1919)

== Arthur Twining Hadley Prize ==
An annual tradition during Yale College Class Day, the Arthur Twining Hadley Prize is "awarded to the graduating senior majoring in the social sciences who ranks highest in scholarship." Recipients of this award include Jennifer Nou and Andrew Klaber.

== Personal life ==
He married Helen Harrison Morris on June 30, 1891, daughter of Luzon Buritt Morris, who was to become Governor of Connecticut in 1893. They had two sons, Morris and Hamilton, and one daughter, Laura.

== Notes ==
Academic offices
Preceded by Timothy Dwight V	President of Yale University; 1899–1921	Succeeded by James Rowland Angell
