= Marc Gustafson =

White House Situation Room Director

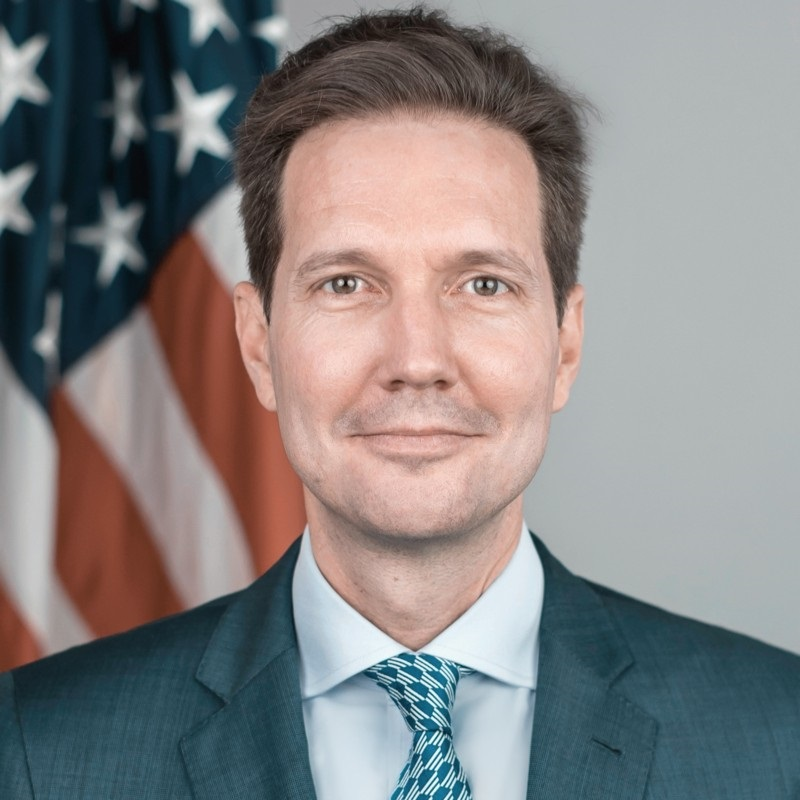

Personal details
- Education: New York University; University of Oxford
- Occupation: National security official, intelligence officer
- Known for: White House Chief of Intelligence; Senior Director, White House Situation Room

Marc Gustafson is an American national security official who has held senior positions in the administrations of presidents Barack Obama, Donald Trump, and Joe Biden including roles as head of the White House Situation Room and as the chief of intelligence for the U.S. National Security Council. He is now the managing director of analysis at Eurasia Group.

== Career ==
Gustafson served as an intelligence advisor to President Biden and managed over 140 intelligence officers and military personnel as the senior director of the White House Situation Room. In this capacity, he also served as the National Security Council representative to the president and routinely traveled with President Biden.

During the Obama and Trump administrations, Gustafson served as the director and senior director for African affairs at the U.S. National Security Council. Prior to his roles at the White House, he worked for over 15 years at the Central Intelligence Agency (CIA), where he was a senior intelligence manager. His work at the CIA focused on regions including the Middle East, Africa, and Asia.

== Education ==
Gustafson earned a Bachelor of Arts degree from New York University. He was later awarded a Marshall Scholarship and completed a Master of Philosophy degree at the University of Oxford. His Doctor of Philosophy research concentrated on the political history of Sudan, with a focus on elections and democratic development.
