= Christopher Thornberg =

American economist

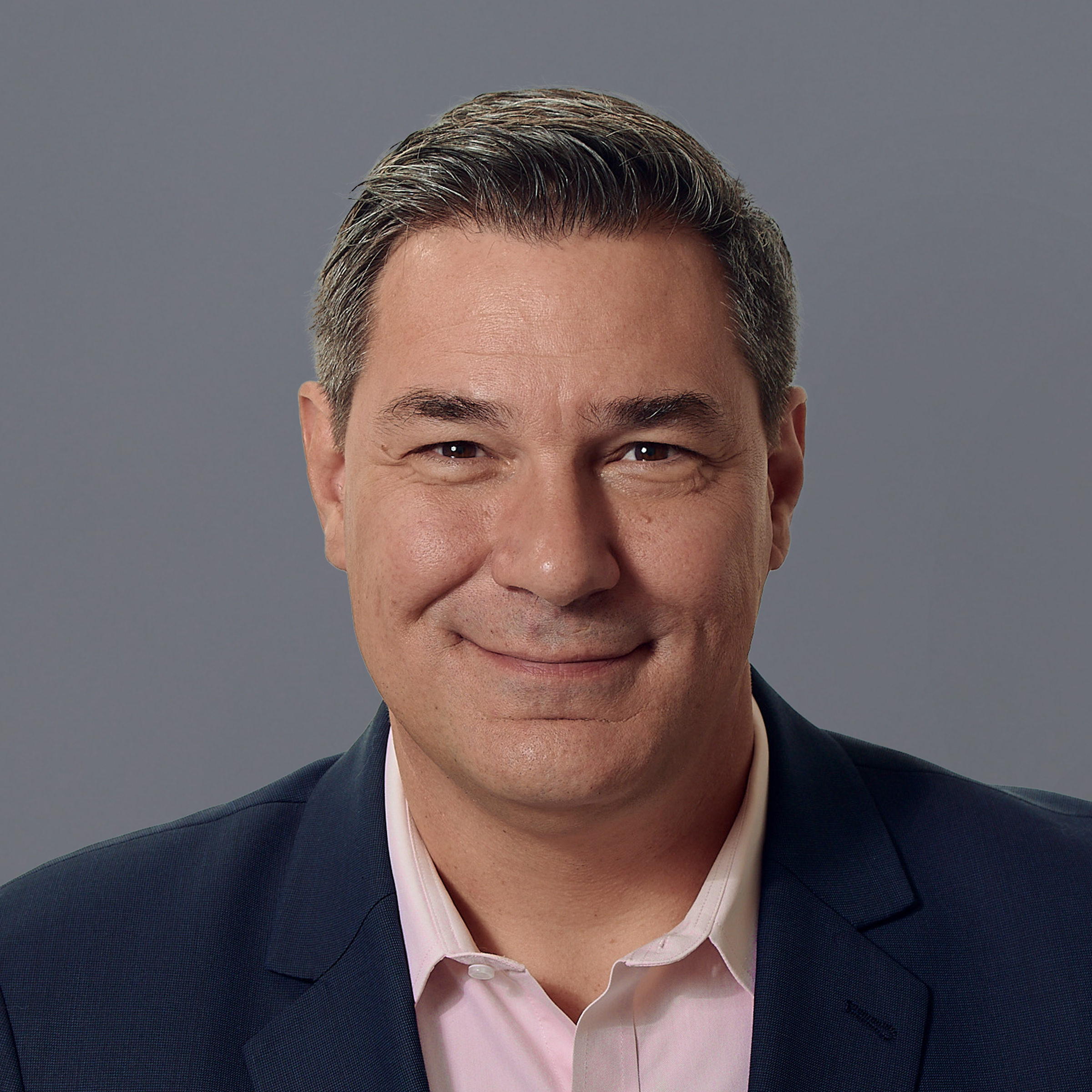
- Christopher Thornberg Speaker Profile Picture from Beacon Economics LLC 2022
- Born: October 17, 1967 (age 58); Rochester, New York

Academic background
- Education: State University of New York at Buffalo (B.S.), 1989; UCLA (Ph.D.), 1997

Academic work
- Discipline: Economics

Christopher Thornberg is an economist, public speaker, and the founding partner of Beacon Economics, LLC, an independent research and consulting firm. From 2015 to 2023, he was director of the UC Riverside School of Business Center for Economic Forecasting and Development.

== Education and early career ==
Thornberg is a native of Rochester, New York. He graduated from the State University of New York at Buffalo in 1989 with a B.S. in Business Administration from the School of Management. He then attended the UCLA Anderson School of Management where he received his Ph.D. in Business Economics in 1997. He first started his career as an economics professor at Clemson University. Soon though, he moved back to UCLA where he researched under the university's economic forecasting center.

== Media Appearances ==
Thornberg has appeared on NBC's The Today Show, ABC's Nightline, CNN, FOX News Channel, NPR, and is regularly quoted in major national and California dailies including The Wall Street Journal, The New York Times, The Washington Post, Los Angeles Times, and Chicago Tribune.

== Work ==
Thornberg has served on the advisory board of Wall Street hedge fund Paulson & Co. Inc. Between 2008 and 2012, he served as a chief economic advisor to the California State Controller's Office and served as Chair of State Controller John Chiang's Council of Economic Advisors.
