= Paulson & Co. =

American investment management firm

Paulson & Co. Inc.
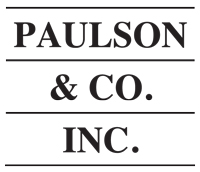
- Industry: Investment management, Family office
- Founded: 1994; 32 years ago
- Founder: John Paulson
- Headquarters: Palm Beach, Florida, US

Paulson & Co., Inc. is an American investment management company based in Palm Beach, Florida, United States. Previously, it was a hedge fund established by John Paulson in 1994. Since 2020, the firm has operated as a family office managing Paulson's personal wealth. Specializing in "global mergers, event arbitrage, and credit strategies", the firm had a relatively low profile on Wall Street until its hugely successful bet against the subprime mortgage market in 2007. At one time the company had offices in London and Dublin.

== History ==
=== Early years ===
Paulson & Co. Inc. was established by John Paulson, its founder and president, in 1994.

Paulson has invested in a number of undervalued companies that are acquisition targets, aiming to increase the bid price on these companies as a large shareholder. In 1997, Paulson, which owned a 6.2% stake in Washington National Corp., opposed PennCorp Financial Group Inc.'s $400 million deal to take over Washington National, calling the terms of the deal "inadequate". This holding out paid off when another suitor, Conseco Inc., purchased Washington National for $410 million.

=== 2008 financial crisis and the Great Recession ===
In 2005, Paulson Co. analyst Paolo Pellegrini convinced John Paulson of the danger of weak credit underwriting standards, excessive leverage among financial institutions and a fundamental mispricing of credit risk particularly in the housing market. Paulson began "shorting" this credit risk by purchasing the hitherto obscure derivative known as credit default swaps to "insure" debt securities (Paulson Co. did not own the securities it was "insuring", but merely believed they would default) they thought would decline in value due to weak credit underwriting. The bubble continued to grow through 2005 and 2006, but by 2007 began to deflate.

In one later widely publicized deal, Goldman Sachs put together a "synthetic" collateralized debt obligation (CDO) called ABACUS 2007-AC1 where investors (such as the European banks IKB Deutsche Industrie, and ABN Amro, and the New York insurance company ACA Financial Guaranty) provided the "long" by taking the risk from subprime mortgage bonds, effectively providing Paulson with insurance in the case of subprime mortgage default. The deal was made in late April 2007 and several months later the bonds began to default and Paulson eventually made about $1 billion total from those investors' losses. In total Paulson reportedly earned $15 billion on $12.5 billion of investment in 2007—a return of over 100%.

In 2008, Paulson's bearish outlook on the credit markets continued. Paulson believed that credit problems would expand beyond subprime mortgages into consumer, auto, commercial and corporate credit, stressing financial institutions and causing some to fail. This led them to take short positions in several large financial institutions in the US and the UK that had high degrees of leverage, high concentrations of assets in deteriorating sectors and rising credit costs. Sectors include mortgage finance companies, specialty finance companies and regional, national, and global banks.

In September 2008, Paulson bet against four of the five biggest British banks including a £350m bet against Barclays; £292m against Royal Bank of Scotland; and £260m against Lloyds TSB. Paulson is reported to have earned a total of £280m after reducing its short position in RBS in January 2009.

To help protect their bets, PCI and others successfully prevented attempts to limit foreclosures and rework mortgage loans.

==== Criticism and lawsuits ====
Paulson has been criticized in the ABACUS investment for paying Goldman $15 million to put together a collection of "toxic" subprime securities with his help (creating "the concept" of the "ethically challenged 'synthetic' securities") to be sold by Goldman to long investors so that Paulson could bet against it, a process critics called "sleazy", or the work of those lacking a "moral compass", though not illegal. Paulson has replied that they "were not involved in the marketing of any Abacus products to any third parties," and that "Paulson did not sponsor or initiate Goldman's Abacus program."

In April 2010, the U.S. Securities and Exchange Commission (SEC) sued Goldman Sachs over the ABACUS Synthetic CDO in SEC v. Goldman Sachs, alleging Goldman had represented the assembler of the mortgage package underlying the CDOs as an objective third party (ACA Management), when in fact a "short" standing to reap great financial benefit in the event the CDO's default (Paulson) had a major role in assembling the mortgage package. Paulson released a statement saying that it was "not the subject of this complaint, made no misrepresentations and is not the subject of any charges". Goldman neither admitted nor denied the SEC allegations, but three months later paid $550 million to settle the charges (the largest penalty a Wall Street company has ever paid to the SEC), acknowledging that it gave investors "incomplete information".

In 2011, ACA Financial Guaranty ACAFG.UL filed a lawsuit against Paulson for $120 million, claiming Goldman Sachs and Paulson "deceived ACA into believing Paulson was investing in the CDO". Paulson made money betting against ACA's position in the CDO. In 2013, Paulson asked a judge to dismiss the lawsuit, alleging ACA had relied on "mischaracterizations, emails unrelated to Abacus, and snippets of correspondence taken out of context".

=== Recovery and bankruptcy investment ===
Paulson also has a long track record of investing in distressed debt, bankruptcies and restructurings. The Great Recession resulted in a record high level of defaults and bankruptcies across numerous industries, and Paulson was a large investor in many of them, including the Lehman Brothers bankruptcy and liquidation.

At the end of 2008, following the collapse of Lehman Brothers and the subsequent turmoil in the markets, Paulson launched a fund dedicated to restructuring and/or recapitalizing companies such as investment banks, hedge funds, insurance and hotel, that were feeling the pressure of the more than $345 billion of write downs of under-performing assets linked to the housing market. By providing capital to companies at "trough valuations", Paulson believed it would enable the firms to survive the crisis while Paulson would profit from recovery by buying at the market bottom.

Amongst some of the holdings disclosed in Paulson's June 30, 2009 13F filings were 2 million shares of Goldman Sachs as well as 35 million shares in Regions Financial. Paulson also purchased shares of Bank of America in the spring of 2009 when the bank was forced to recapitalize its balance sheet following the results of the bank stress tests conducted by the US government, and was reported to have a 1.22% stake in the bank in 2011. According to Bloomberg, Paulson purchased the shares expecting the stock to double by 2011.

Paulson's invested in Citigroup and reportedly earned $1 billion in 2009 through the end of 2010, which John Paulson called a demonstration of "the upside potential of many of the restructuring investments we have added to our portfolio and our ability to generate above-average returns in large positions."

In February 2010, PCI was linked to the restructuring and recapitalization of the publisher Houghton Mifflin Harcourt. The agreement included restructuring about $4 billion of its $7 billion debt load by converting it to new equity issued to the senior debt holders, one of whom was Paulson. Through this debt to equity conversion, Paulson would reportedly become the company's largest equity investor.

Another one of Paulson's specialties is proxy event investment. In May 2008 Carl Icahn launched a proxy fight at Yahoo to replace its board and a 13F filing for the quarter ending March 31, 2008 showed ownership by Paulson of 50 million shares of Yahoo.

==== Gold Thesis ====
In November 2009 Paulson announced a gold fund focused on gold mining stocks and gold-related investments believing that the massive amount of balance sheet expansion from countercyclical monetary stimulus undertaken by the Federal Reserve and other central banks would eventually lead to inflation in the US dollar and other fiat currencies. In the words of John Paulson, "We view gold as a currency, not a commodity. Its importance as a currency will continue to increase as the major central banks around the world continue to print money."

==== 2011 to 2020 ====
In 2011 PCI was ranked as the "world's fourth-largest hedge fund" with $36 billion in assets under management. However, during the course of that year his Advantage fund lost 36% and Advantage Plus 52%. The funds also had double-digit losses the next year. An unsuccessful investment in the Sino-Forest Corporation and a drop in the price of gold were in part responsible.

In 2012, Paulson purchased 6 million shares of NovaCopper (later named Trilogy Metals). Paulson continued to add to its position, eventually owning 14.3 million shares (an 8.7% stake in the company) by June 2019. Paulson sold its entire stake in the fourth quarter of 2025, following the White House's announcement to acquire a 10% stake in Trilogy Metals in an effort to develop a major copper and zinc mine in Alaska. The price of the stock skyrocketed after the announcement, pushing the value of Paulson's investment from $30 million to roughly $100 million.

In August 2013, Paulson entered into a merger agreement for the acquisition of Steinway Musical Instruments in a transaction valued at approximately $512 million. The company initiated a tender offer within five days for all of the outstanding stock, and Steinway Musical Instruments board recommended that shareholders accepted the offer. In September 2013, Paulson announced the completion of acquisition of Steinway Musical Instruments.

In April 2018, the firm has taken a stake in Viacom Inc., an American media company and has become one of the top-25 shareholders.

In 2018, the firm managed $9 billion in assets, down from its peak of $38 billion in 2011.

=== Family Office ===
In 2020, Paulson & Co. returned all external investor capital and converted to a private Family office, focusing on John Paulson's fortune.

== Hedge fund business model ==
The firm was a partnership, the partners being John Paulson and 10+ other members of the firm. Paulson provided services to investment vehicle pools and manages accounts for banking institutions, corporations and pension and profit sharing plans. As of December 2015 the John Paulson's hedge funds had $19 billion assets under management, compared to $18 billion in September 2013 and $36 billion in early 2011. Almost 60 percent of the assets under management belong to the firm's own employees, including John Paulson's, as of 2012. External investors in the Paulson funds included financial institutions, corporate and public pension funds, endowments, foundations and high-net-worth individuals.

The hedge funds previously managed by Paulson & Co, included:

- Paulson Advantage Fund (its flagship fund)
- Paulson Advantage Plus Fund
- Gold fund (launched in January 2010 with a long-term strategy focus investing in mining companies and bullion-based derivatives)
- Paulson Partners
- Paulson Enhanced
- Paulson Recovery
- Paulson Real Estate Recovery (launched in 2009 to invest in distressed real estate markets with a 'private equity' investment style)
- Credit Opportunities Fund

Areas of expertise include:

- Merger arbitrage: High quality spread deals, announced mergers with the possibility of higher bids, unique deal structures, short deals unlikely to close;
- Event arbitrage: Spin-offs, litigations, restructurings, proxy contests, post-Bankruptcy equities;
- Distressed securities: Liquidations, high yield long/short, capital structure arbitrage, bankruptcies, reorganizations.

At one time there were around 15 investment professionals in the firm, including John Paulson who was the Portfolio Manager for all funds under management. Other key investment professionals included Andrew Klaber, Andrew Hoine, Nikolai Petchenikov, Sheru Chowdry, Sihan Shu, Michael Waldorf and Ty Wallach.

Paulson & Co had an external advisory board of well known economists that met on a monthly basis to discuss investment themes, macroeconomic risks, and global fiscal and monetary policy. Past members of the Paulson advisory Board were Alan Greenspan (President of Greenspan Associates LLP), Christopher Thornberg (Economist, Beacon Economics LLC), Edward Altman (Professor, Stern School of Business, NYU), and Martin Feldstein (Professor, Harvard University).

Paulson was registered with the U.S. Securities and Exchange Commission (SEC) in the United States, the Financial Services Authority (FSA) in the United Kingdom, and the Securities and Futures Commission (SFC) in Hong Kong.

== See also ==
- 2008 financial crisis
- List of hedge funds
- Sino-Forest Corporation
