= Situation Room =

Intelligence operations complex in the White House

Coordinates: 38.89728°N 77.03771°W

White House Situation Room & Watch Center
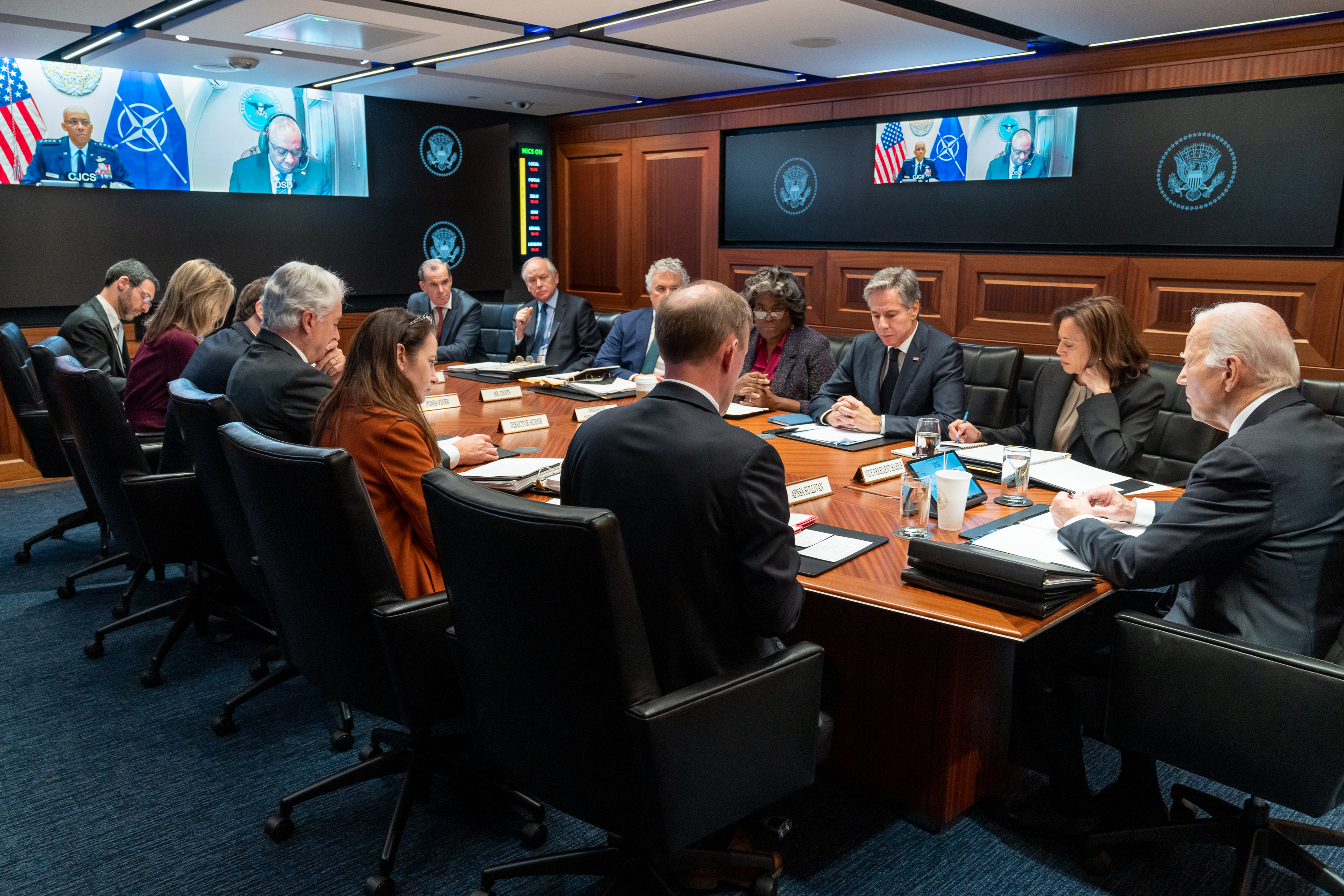
- President Biden and national security officials in the newly renovated Situation Room on October 11, 2023
- Building: West Wing basement of the White House
- Location: Washington, D.C.
- Country: United States
- Purpose: Conference room and intelligence management complex

The Situation Room & Watch Center is an intelligence management complex on the ground floor of the West Wing of the White House. Although the name suggests it is a single room, it is a 5,000 square feet (460 m^{2}) operations suite consisting of a duty watch station and three secure conference rooms. It is run by about 130 National Security Council (NSC) staff for the use of the president of the United States, chief of staff, national security advisor, homeland security advisor, and other senior advisors for monitoring and dealing with crises, as well as conducting secure communications with outside (often overseas) persons. The Situation Room has secure, advanced communications equipment for the president to maintain command and control of U.S. forces around the world. The Situation Room has been upgraded several times, most recently in late 2023.

== Origin and staff ==
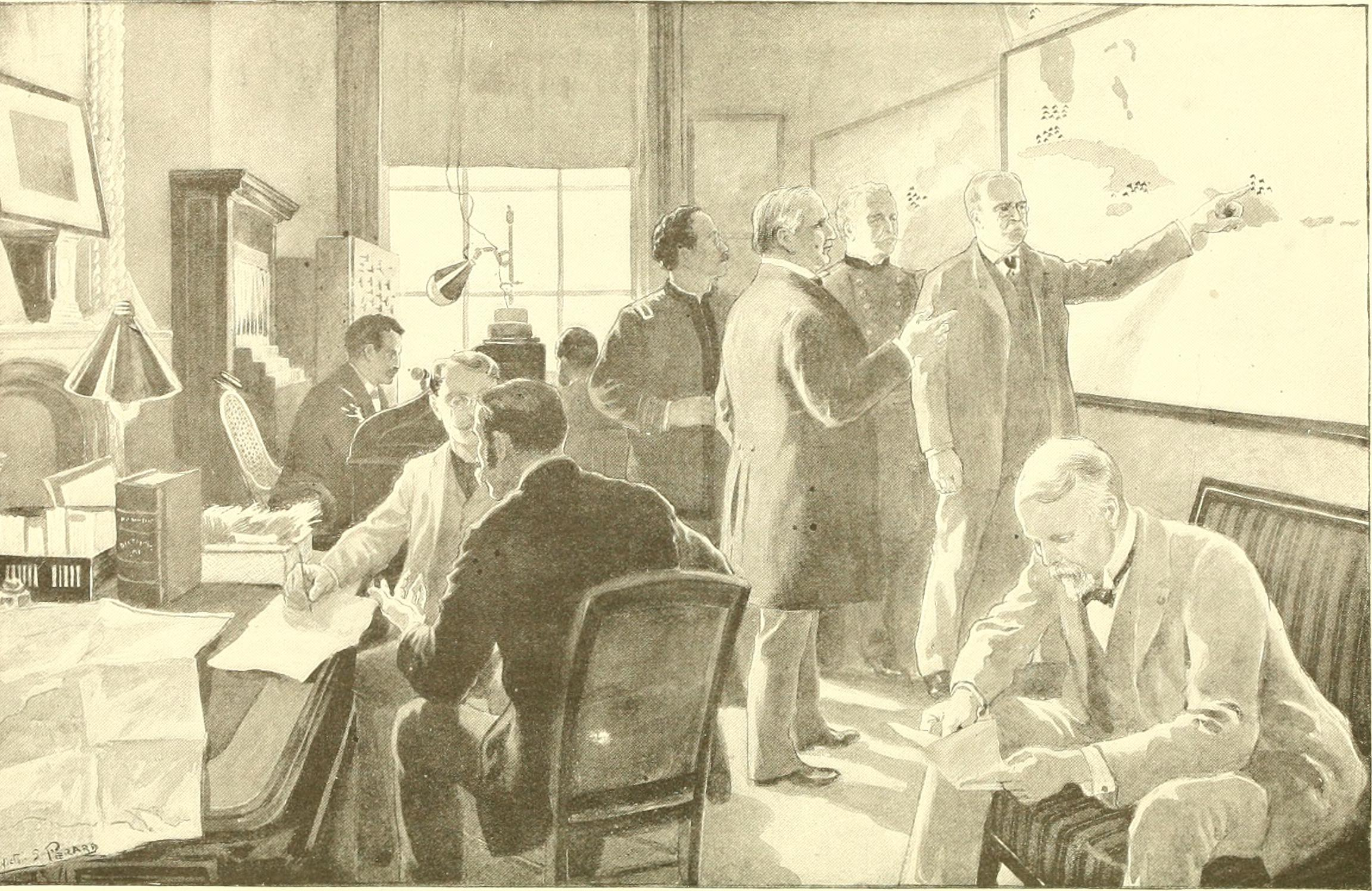
In the War Room at Washington, Secretary Long, Alger, Major General Miles, progress of the Spanish American War

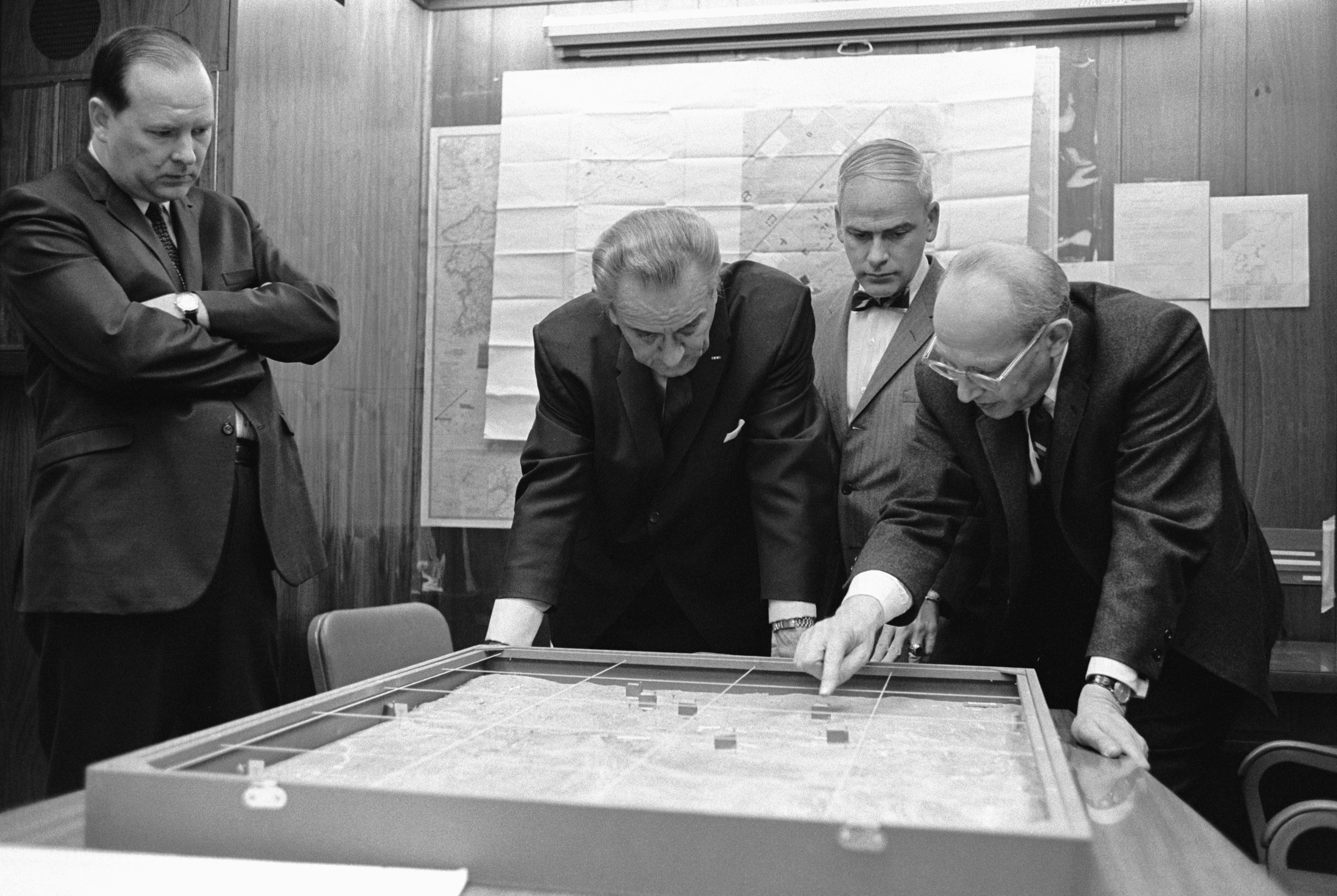
Situation Room: National Security Advisor Walt Rostow showing President Lyndon B. Johnson a model of the Khe Sanh area on February 15, 1968

The concept of a "War Room" in the White House originated with President William McKinley in 1898 during the Spanish–American War. During McKinley’s tenure, it contained telegraph systems and maps.

The Situation Room was created in 1961 on the order of President John F. Kennedy after the failure of the Bay of Pigs invasion was attributed to a lack of current information. The facility has secure communications systems; the wood panels over the walls hide audio, video, and other systems.

The Situation Room staff is about 130 people, including five watch teams, which monitor domestic and international events; a travel support team; video operators; and communications technicians. Each watch team includes six duty officers, a communications assistant, and a senior intelligence analyst, though the number and composition of the teams may vary, depending on shift requirements and workload. The teams are staffed from a pool of senior personnel from agencies in the intelligence community and from the military. These members are chosen from heavily vetted nominations made by their parent agencies and are apolitical. They stand watch round the clock, monitoring world events and keeping senior White House staff apprised of significant incidents. The current director of the Situation Room is Marc Gustafson.

== Functions ==
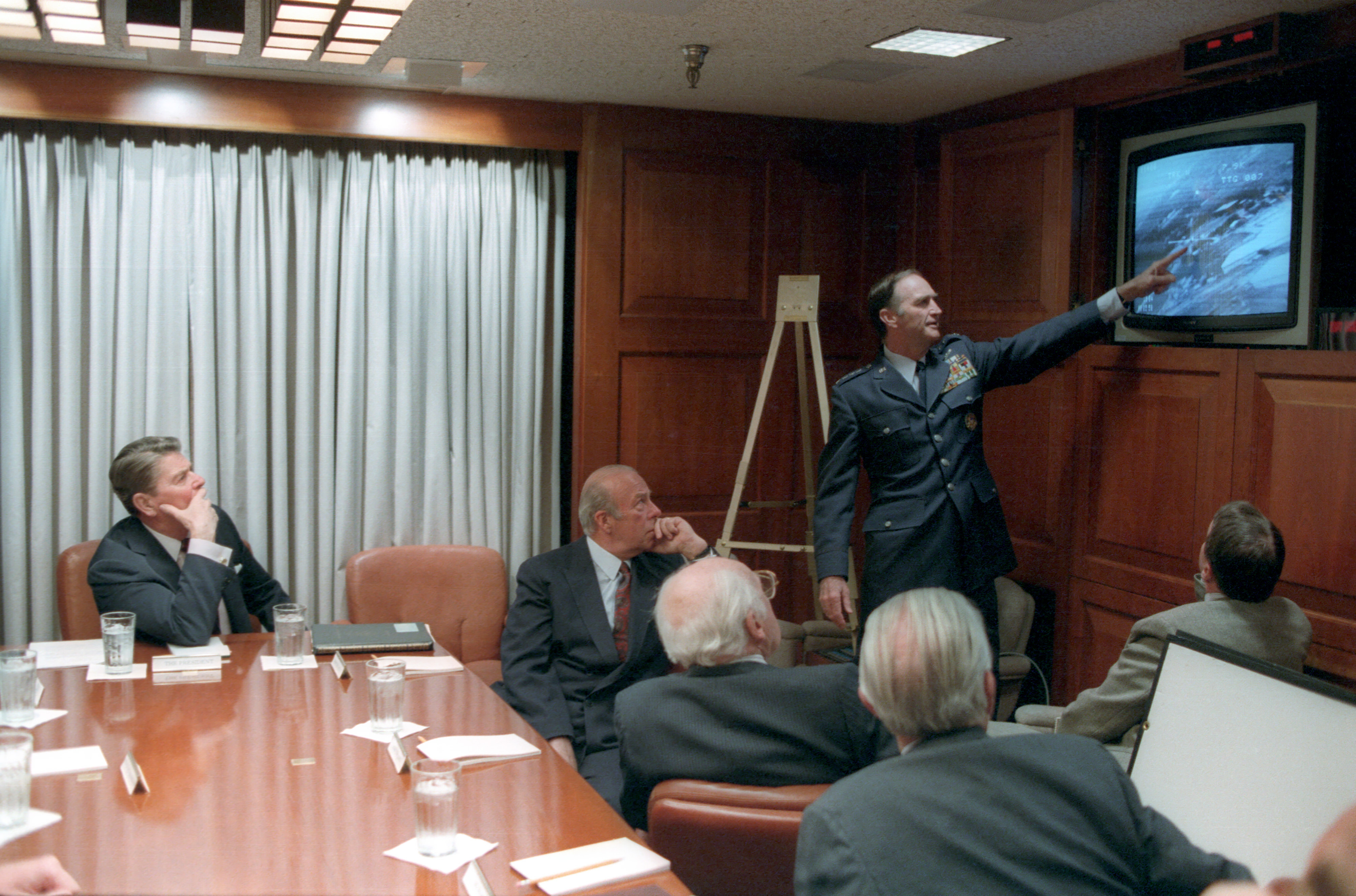
President Ronald Reagan is briefed on events taking place in Libya in the White House Situation Room, 1986

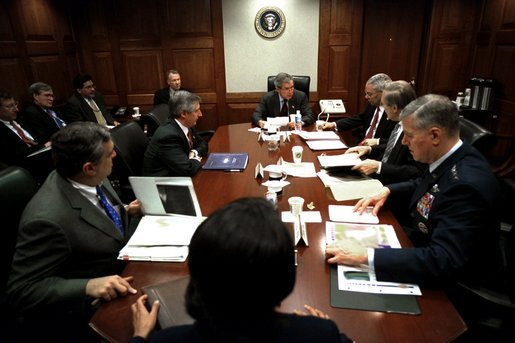
President George W. Bush meeting with his war council in the Situation Room on March 21, 2003

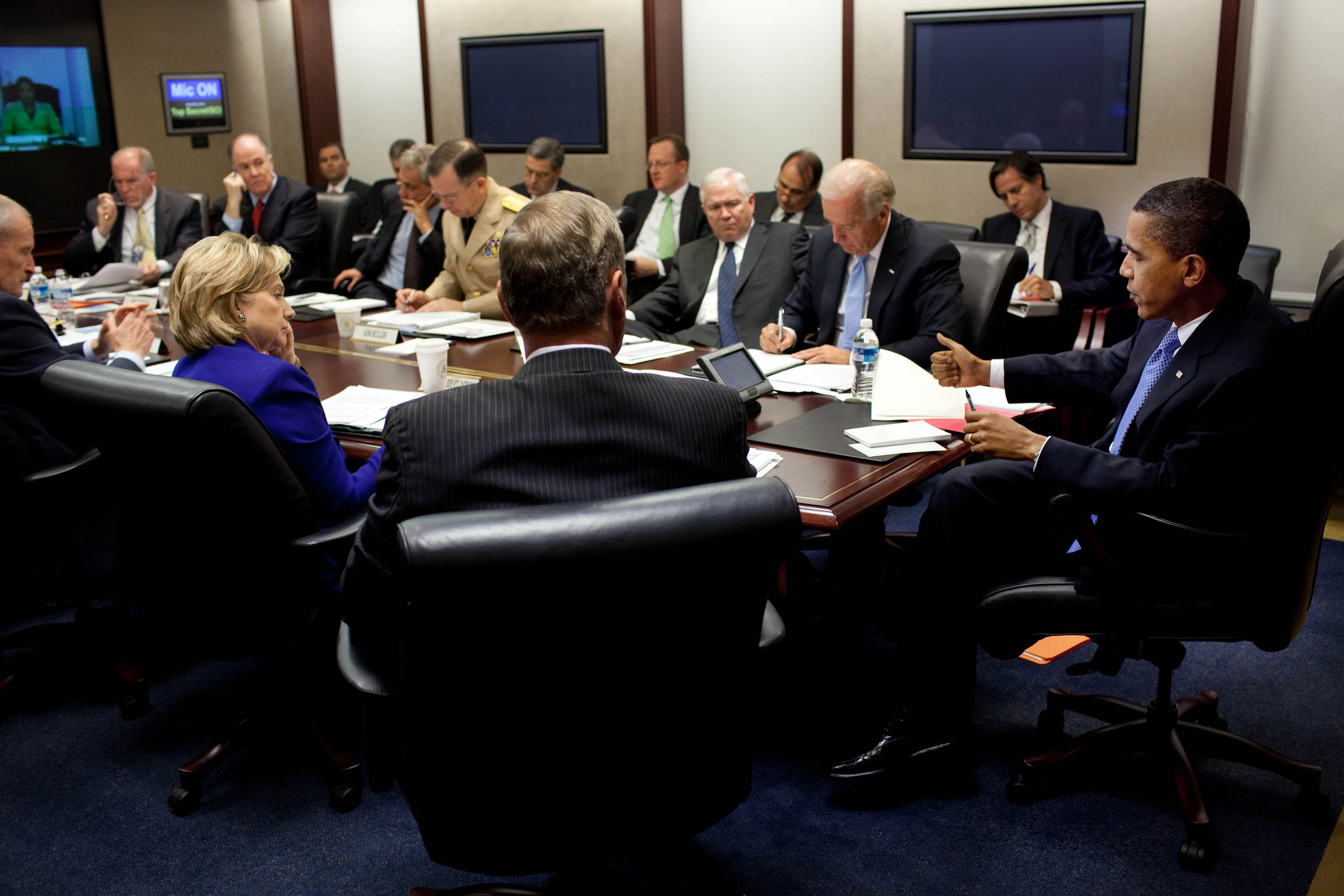
President Barack Obama holding a strategy review on Afghanistan in the Situation Room on September 30, 2009

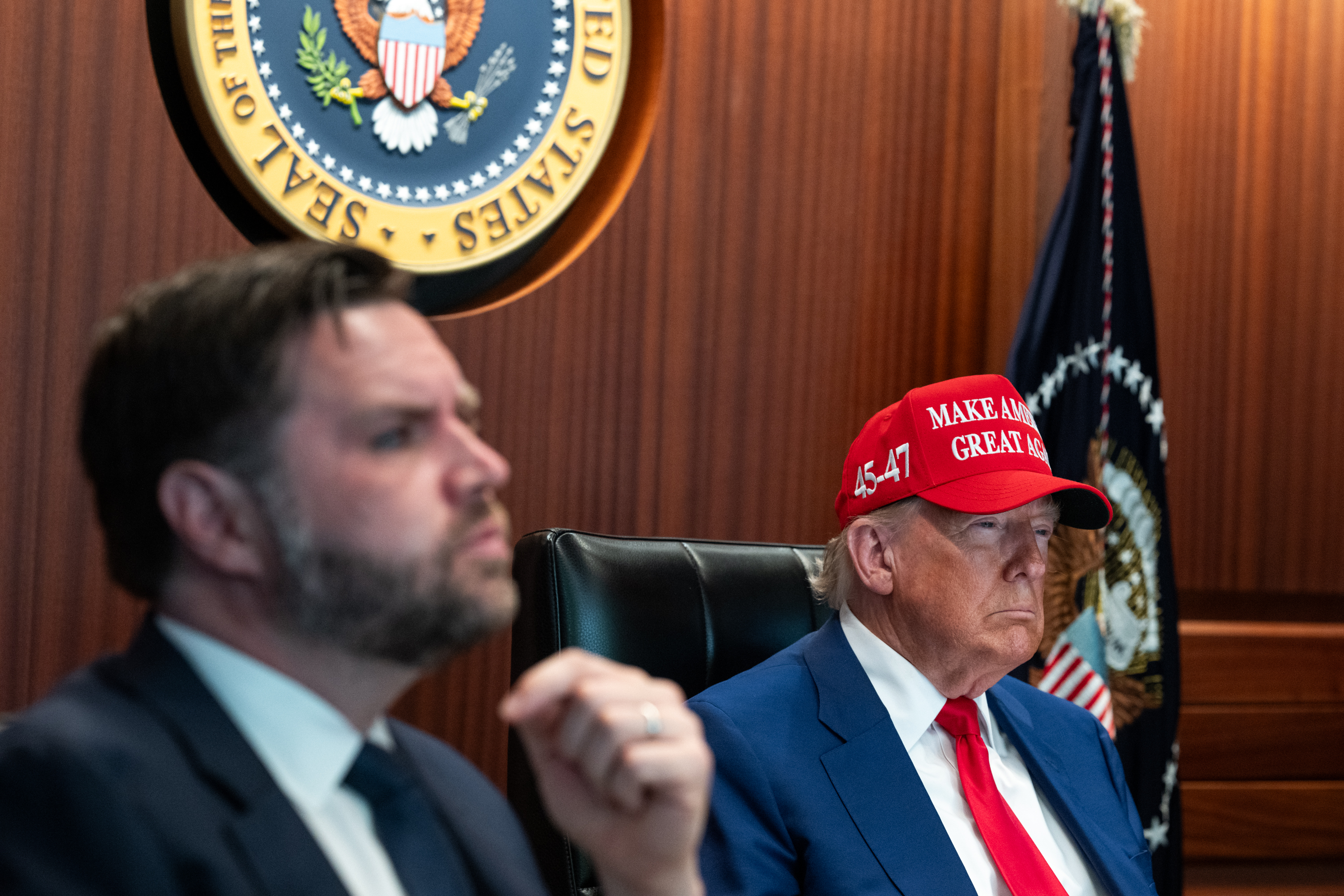
President Donald Trump and Vice President JD Vance in the room during the strikes on Iran's nuclear sites on June 21, 2025

The purpose of the Situation Room is to provide current intelligence and crisis support to the NSC staff, the national security advisor, and the president. The room is a round-the-clock meeting-place for sensitive information flowing to and from the White House. It is also the funnel through which most communications, especially classified information, pass when the president is not in residence—an essential link, giving the traveling White House access to all the information from Washington's national-security community.

The day begins with the watch team's preparation of the Morning Book. Prepared for the president, the vice president, and most senior White House staff, the Morning Book contains a copy of the National Intelligence Daily, the State Department's Morning Summary, and diplomatic cables and intelligence reports. The Book is usually in the car when the national security advisor is picked up for work. The morning routine also includes the President's Daily Brief, prepared by the Office of the Director of National Intelligence; this is delivered to the president and other NSC principals by an intelligence officer, who briefs them about the document.

In addition, the Watch Teams produce morning and evening summaries of select material. These summaries of interagency issues are sent electronically to the NSC staff.

The Situation Room staff also provides alerts on new events to NSC and White House personnel. Responsible for informing the president is the national security adviser. Later, a written "Sit Room Note" is prepared, summarizing the event with current reports from other centers, perhaps including a photo, diagram, or map. The task of the Situation Room staff is to ensure that the president and national security advisor are informed not only of the current situation but also of how the situation is being portrayed by the news media.

Another typical Situation Room activity is arranging the president's phone calls and other sensitive communications with foreign heads of state. This includes scheduling such calls at each end, providing interpreters where necessary, and ensuring appropriate security and record-keeping. In this function, the Situation Room coordinates closely with the White House Communications Agency.

== 2006–2007 renovation ==
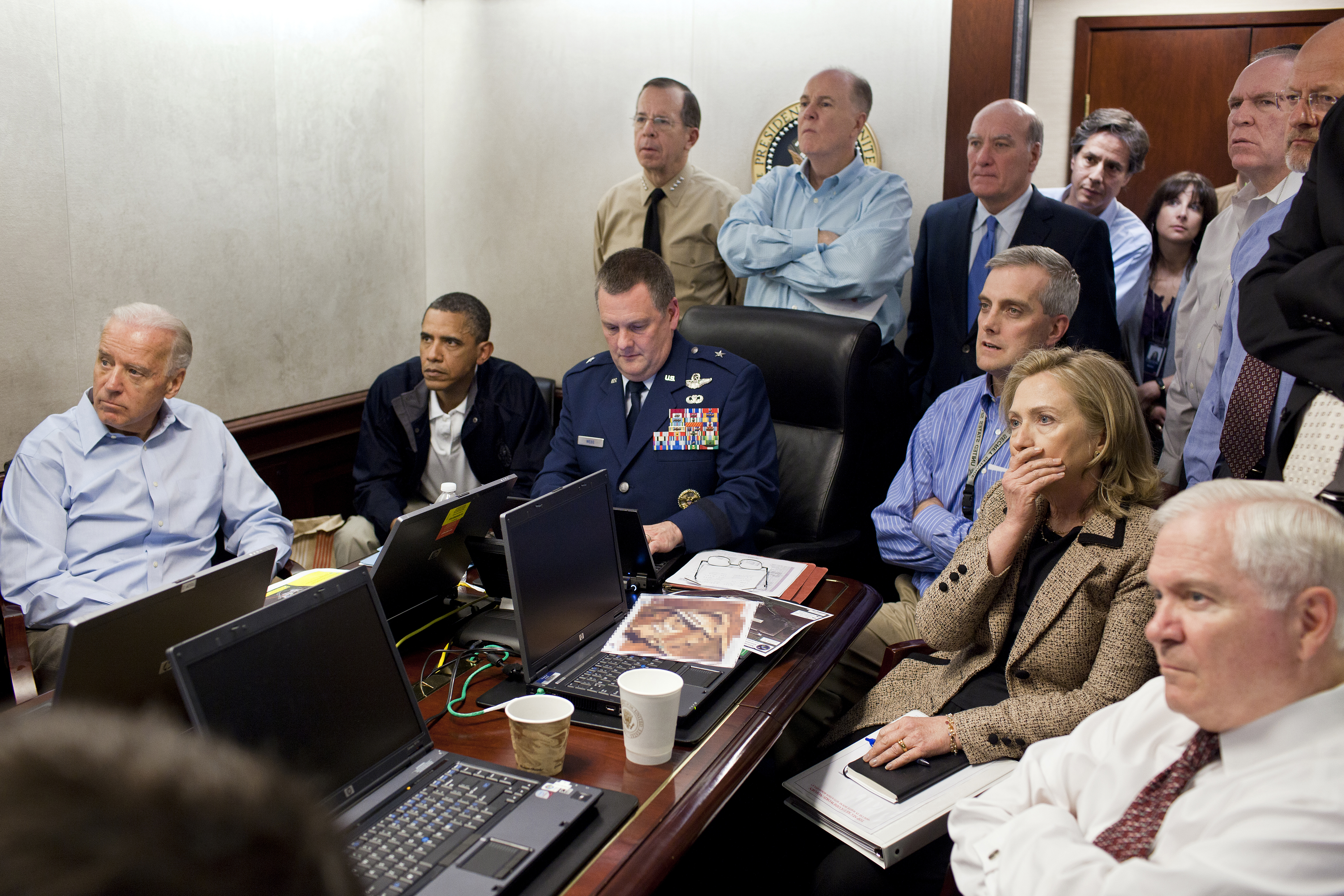
Situation Room: President Barack Obama and Vice President Joe Biden, with members of the national security team, receive an update on Operation Neptune Spear, a mission against Osama bin Laden, in one of the conference rooms of the Situation Room of the White House, May 1, 2011

Video of the Situation Room after renovation

The only thorough renovation of the Situation Room took place in 2006 and 2007. Until then, the room used cathode-ray tubes for monitors, fax for communication, and computers and telephones of the mid 1980s. The room also had a small kitchen with no sink. Encrypted audio-visual equipment was also unreliable and would sometimes go black, "prompting a presidential outburst". The Situation Room was once described as "uncomfortable, unaesthetic and essentially oppressive"; others termed the complex before renovation "something of a low-tech dungeon".

Planning for the renovation began before the September 11, 2001, attacks; the project became more urgent afterward.

Renovations began in August 2006, when the Situation Room complex was gutted down to bricks and bare floor. Rebuilding took about four and a half months and was disruptive, particularly to White House chief of staff Joshua Bolten, whose office was directly above it. The New York Times reported that "Staff members described sitting in his room and hearing ear-piercing noise or watching water ripple in glasses on his desk as the floor shook." The renovation yielded several pieces from decades before, including coaxial cables; columns; and a frame window from a sunken courtyard from the presidency of Franklin D. Roosevelt.

The renovations allowed the use of the room to expand from only the National Security Council to include the Homeland Security Council and the office of the White House chief of staff. A secure direct feed to Air Force One was added.

Sensors were installed in the ceilings to detect cellular signals to prevent unauthorized communications and bugging by mobile phones, personal digital assistants, and other devices. Before the renovation, the Secret Service confiscated cell-phones but had no other means of preventing smuggled communication devices.

The renovation was formally completed by mid-May 2007. On May 17, 2007, President George W. Bush and British prime minister Tony Blair participated in a video conference with members of their Iraq teams from the newly renovated Situation Room. The following day, President Bush officially opened the newly refurbished Situation Room in a ribbon-cutting ceremony.

Two of the rooms in the complex were preserved, these being the main conference room and the secure video transmission site. They are currently located at the Ronald Reagan Presidential Library and the George W. Bush Presidential Center.

== 2023 renovation ==
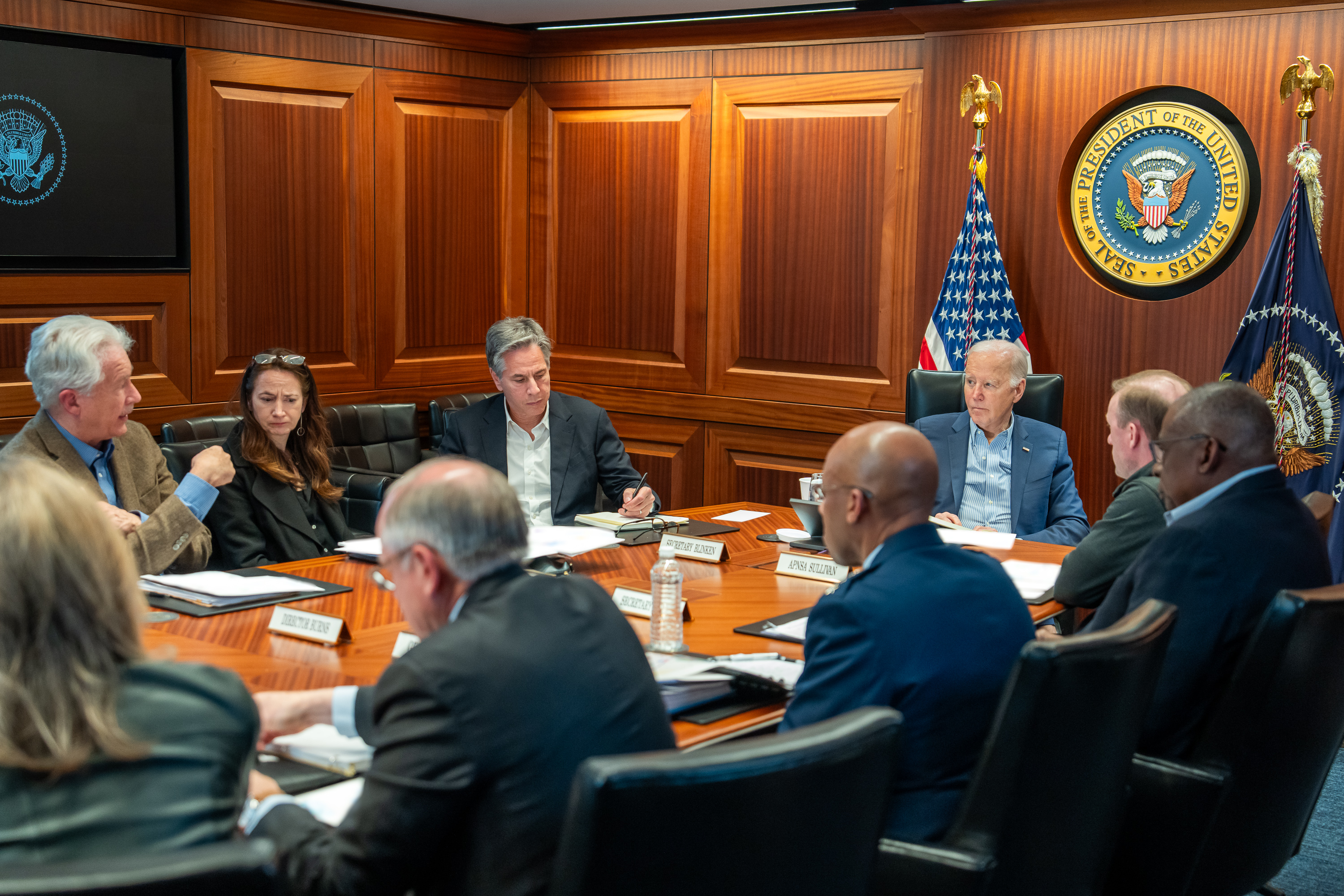
The Situation Room in April 2024, during the Iranian strikes in Israel

The Situation Room complex was upgraded in late 2023 after a yearlong renovation for a cost of $50 million. Marc Gustafson was responsible for leading the renovation process. The walls were made with sustainably harvested wood, with new monitors installed into them. Faster servers, updated audio equipment, and new computers were also included in the renovation. New leather chairs were added in each room, replacing worn furniture. White House senior staff were given the opportunity to weigh in on the design of the facility.

The walls, ceilings, and floors were refitted with a modular design that can allow easy access to technology behind them. This is expected to allow easier renovation in the future.

== See also ==
- Map Room established in 1942 by President Franklin Delano Roosevelt's personal Naval Aide John McCrea
- National Military Command Center – Main war rooms for the President and Secretary of Defense in the Pentagon
- Presidential Emergency Operations Center – Bunker underneath the East Wing of the White House
