= Andrew Klaber =

American investment executive

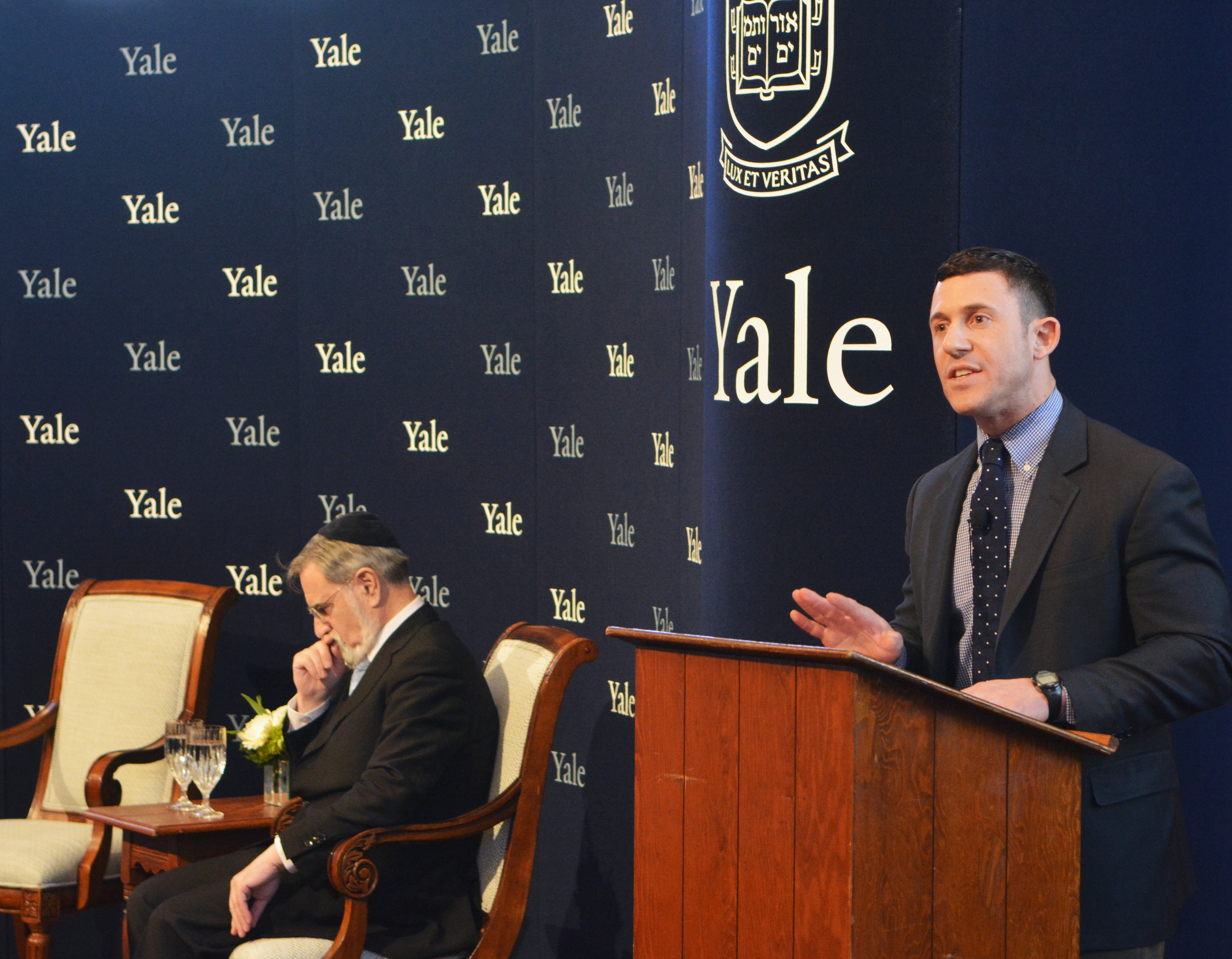
- Klaber at Yale University
- Education: Yale University; Oxford University; Harvard Law School; Harvard Business School
- Employer: Bedford Ridge Capital

Andrew Klaber is the chief executive officer of Bedford Ridge Capital, an investment management firm in New York. Previously, Klaber was a partner on the investment team at Paulson & Co., a multi-strategy hedge fund. He is also the founder and emeritus chairman and president of Even Ground, an international non-profit organization that annually provides academic support, basic health care, and nutrition to more than 2,000 children who have been orphaned or made vulnerable by HIV/AIDS.

== Education ==
Originally from Buffalo Grove, Illinois, Klaber attended Adlai E. Stevenson High School, graduated summa cum laude and Phi Beta Kappa president from Yale College, where he was a Truman Scholar, Udall Scholar, and First-Team USA-Today Academic All-American, and received the Arthur Twining Hadley Prize and David Everett Chantler Award at graduation for "exemplifying qualities of courage, strength of character and high moral purpose." He earned Masters of Science degrees in Financial Economics and Economic History as a Marshall Scholar at Oxford University, and holds a JD/MBA from Harvard Law School and Harvard Business School, where he graduated with Distinction and as the Dean's Award winner.

He is a Fellow at Trumbull College, Yale University.

== Sports ==
Andrew rowed on the Yale lightweight crew (2002 national champions), ran in the Berlin, Boston, Chicago, Hamptons, London, New York (2009, 2013, 2016), Paris, Philadelphia, Valencia, and Washington, D.C. marathons, climbed Mount Kilimanjaro, and pedaled 4,200 miles (New Haven, Connecticut, to San Francisco, California) to raise awareness and financial support for Habitat for Humanity.

== Philanthropy and awards ==
Klaber serves or has served on the boards of several organizations, including the AEI Enterprise Club, President of the Association of Marshall Scholars, Bowery Mission Advisory and Development Board, Brookings Society, Cornell Tech Jacobs Institute Steering Committee, Co-chair of the Echoing Green Social Investment Council, French-American Foundation, Harvard Law School Dean's Visiting Committee, International Rescue Committee, Magdalen Society, Morgan Library Young Fellows, National Museum of American Jewish History, New York Public Library Young Lions, Public Theater Young Partners, Rainforest Alliance Ambassadors Circle, President of the Russell Trust Association, Success Academy Charter Schools Leadership Council, Truman Scholars Association, United Jewish Appeal (UJA), Weizmann Institute of Science, and Yale Alumni Fund.

Klaber is a member of the Council on Foreign Relations, Economic Club of New York, and Supreme Court of the United States Bar and New York State Bar, and was a member of or participated in the Asia Society's Asia 21 Young Leaders Initiative, French American Foundation Young Leaders Program, Council for the United States and Italy Young Leaders Program, Partnership for New York City David Rockefeller Fellows Program, Trilateral Commission David Rockefeller Fellowship, U.S. Secretary of Defense's Joint Civilian Orientation Conference, and Wexner Heritage Program.

Klaber received the President's Environmental Youth Award at the White House in 2001 for his "efforts and commitment to the environment" and the Yale-Jefferson Public Service Award for his "innovative and sustained contributions to society," served with the United Nations Inter-Agency Task Force on Orphaned and Vulnerable Children, and presented Even Ground at the World Economic Forum in Davos, Switzerland in 2008.
