= SEC v. Goldman Sachs =

Court case

SEC v. Goldman, Sachs & Co., 10 civ 3229 (S.D.N.Y. 2010), was a case in the United States District Court for the Southern District of New York, brought by the U.S. Securities and Exchange Commission (SEC) against Goldman, Sachs & Co. (GS&Co.) and Fabrice Tourre, a GS&Co. employee, relating to the synthetic collateralized debt obligation (CDO), ABACUS 2007-AC1 (“ABACUS”), for securities fraud. To settle these SEC charges, GS&Co agreed to pay a civil penalty of $550 million and acknowledged that its marketing materials for ABACUS contained incomplete information. The court approved the settlement.

== History ==
The SEC filed a complaint with the United States District Court for the Southern District of New York on April 16, 2010 against GS&Co. and Fabrice Tourre, an employee of GS&Co. The complaint charged the defendants with securities fraud regarding their synthetic collateralized debt obligation (CDO). The synthetic CDO in question was ABACUS, tied to subprime residential mortgage-backed securities. The SEC alleged that GS&Co. misrepresented the role ACA Management LLC ("ACA") played in selecting the CDO's reference portfolio.

=== Background on involved parties ===
- Goldman, Sachs & Co.: A prominent leader in the global financial services sector. Founded in 1869, the firm's main headquarters are in New York, NY and they have offices globally. GS&Co. is the second largest investment bank in the world and they are known for their wealth management services and proprietary trading. They "aspire to be the world's most exceptional financial institution, united by our shared values of partnership, client service, integrity and excellence."
- U.S. Securities and Exchange Commission: The SEC oversees securities exchanges, securities brokers and dealers, investment advisors, and mutual funds to promote fair dealing, the disclosure of important market information, and to prevent fraud.
- Paulson & Co.: An investment banking firm that specializes in small to mid-cap markets. It was founded in July 1994 as an employee-owned fund based in New York, NY. Paulson & Co. was run by John Alfred Paulson until the company became private in 2020 and focused on managing family money.
- ACA Management LLC: The asset managing division of the bond insurer ACA Capital Holdings. At the time of this event, ACA managed 22 CDOs with $16 billion in underlying assets. ACA had another subdivision called ACA Financial Guaranty, which benefited from their involvement in the deal by selling protection on the transaction.
- IKB Deutsche Industriebank (IKB): A bank that is based in Düsseldorf, Germany, specializing in loans to small and medium-sized companies for more than 90 years. They were bailed out financially in 2007 due to the losses sustained from the ABACUS deal. IKB was found guilty in the ABACUS deal according to the SEC.

=== The event ===
GS&Co.'s marketing materials for the CDO included the term sheet, flip book and an offering memorandum all stated ACA selected the reference portfolio. ACA is a third-party company which specializes in analyzing credit risk in residential mortgage-backed securities (RMBS). Paulson & Co. Inc. ("Paulson") was the company behind the portfolios selection process. Paulson is a large hedge fund that had economic interests that opposed the interests of ABACUS CDO investors.

Paulson elected to short the RMBS portfolio it curated through credit default swap (CDS) agreements with GS&Co. in order to protect themselves against the capital structure of the ABACUS. Paulson's interest in shorting the portfolio meant they had motive to select RMBS that would experience credit events and ultimately fail. GS&Co. failed to disclose Paulson's interests and the involvement the fund played in regard to the RMBS portfolio in any of their marketing material.

Tourre, an employee of GS&Co. in their NYC office was the main architect of the ABACUS CDO according to the SEC. Tourre was the point of contact for investors in regard to the CDO and was responsible for curating the marketing materials which misinformed investors. It is believed he was aware of Paulson's role in regard to the RMBS portfolio and their desire to short it. In addition, it is believed Tourre explicitly informed ACA that Paulson invested about $200 million into ABACUS which implies that Paulson was taking on a long position. Tourre also allegedly informed ACA that Paulson's investment interests aligned with ACA's.

The deal was finalized on April 26, 2007. GS&Co. profited $15 million from Paulson for preparing and advertising the ABACUS CDO. On October 24, 2007, 6 months after the deal was closed, 83% of the RMBS in the portfolio were downgraded and 17% of the RMBS were on negative watch. By January 2008, 99% of the portfolio had been downgraded. This resulted in investors losing over $1 billion, while Paulson's short position garnered them $1 billion in profit.

=== Outcome ===
GS&Co. and Tourre were found guilty of violating Section 17(a) of the Securities Act 15 U.S.C. 77q(a) and 78j(b), Section 10(b) of the Securities Exchange Act and Exchange Act rule 10b-5, 17 C.F.R. 240.10b-5. The SEC fined Goldman $550 million, the largest fine in the SEC's history at the time. $250 million of the fine was paid out to the investors who lost money on the deal, while the remaining $300 million went to the US Treasury. GS&Co. admitted guilt and accepted that their marketing materials provided "incomplete information". The SEC viewed ACA as a victim in the deal, stating they were misled by GS&Co. This resulted in no legal repercussions for them, although ACA was able to benefit from the partnership.

== Impact ==
Once news of the settlement between the SEC and GS&Co. broke, the Dow recovered from its 100-point loss, netting only a 7-point fall. In addition, GS&Co.'s shares went up roughly $6 to close out the market at $145.22 despite rules being passed indicating unprecedented change and regulation of Wall Street. Although the market made a recovery, Wall Street's integrity was brought into question, and rules and regulations increased.
