= Henry Hamilton Hadley =

American theologian

Henry Hamilton Hadley (July 19, 1826 – August 1, 1864) was an American theologian.

== Early years and education ==
Hadley was born in Fairfield, New York, on July 19, 1826. He was the youngest son of Prof. James Hadley, of Buffalo, New York, and the brother of philologist James Hadley.

He graduated from Yale College in 1847.

== Career ==
After graduation, he pursued for one year a general course of study at Yale, and then entered the Theological Department of the college. In Sept. 1850 he went to Andover Theological Seminary, where he completed his studies in preparation for the ministry in 1851. In May of that year, he became Tutor in Yale College, and continued in this office until Dec. 1852.

At the beginning of the year 1853, owing to doubts in regard to his fitness for the pastoral work, he turned his attention to the study of law, and removed to the city of New York. His scholastic tendencies, however, were too strong to be resisted, and in 1854 he returned to New Haven, where he devoted himself for four years to the careful study of the Hebrew language and the Old Testament Scriptures. For part of this period he was also employed as an instructor in Greek and Latin at the New Haven Collegiate and Commercial Institute. In 1858 he was appointed instructor in Hebrew, in Union Theological Seminary in New York, and in 1862 he became assistant professor of Hebrew in that institution. He continued in that position till the time of his death. In 1861, after the death of Prof. Gibbs, he was elected to the Professorship of the Hebrew language and literature in this college, but he held this office only for a single year, and during that time discharged its duties in connection with the duties of his place in New York.

He had already become one of the most successful and promising scholars in the country in his department, and in his death the cause of theological learning sustained a loss which is not easily measured. His devotion to the cause of the country in the American Civil War was manifested from the very outset. He was with great difficulty, and only by the urgent advice of his friends, prevented from enlisting as a soldier in the Union Army; and, when at length he gave up going himself, he provided successively two substitutes to serve in his place. Not content with this, after the close of the Seminary year in June 1865, he engaged in the work of the United States Sanitary Commission, and served in one of the Hospitals at City Point, Virginia. Here he was prostrated by sickness, and, after lingering for a while, was compelled to return homeward. He had pursued his journey only as far as Washington DC, when his death occurred, Aug, 1, 1864.

This article incorporates public domain material from the Yale Obituary Record.
