= Marshall Aid Commemoration Commission =

The Marshall Aid Commemoration Commission is a non-departmental public body of the British Foreign and Commonwealth Office that awards scholarships and fellowships to American students for postgraduate and postdoctoral study and research at UK universities.

== History ==
Marshall Aid Commemoration Act 1953 (Note: Section 3.)
- Act of Parliament
- Parliament of the United Kingdom
- Long title: An Act to make provision for the granting of scholarships in commemoration of the assistance received by the United Kingdom under the European Recovery Programme and known as Marshall Aid; and for purposes connected with the matter aforesaid.
- Citation: 1 & 2 Eliz. 2. c. 39
- Territorial extent: United Kingdom

Dates
- Royal assent: 31 July 1953
- Commencement: 31 July 1953 (Note: The Acts of Parliament (Commencement) Act 1793.)
Other legislation
| Amended by | Marshall Scholarships Order 2017 |
| Relates to | Marshall Scholarships Act 1959 |

Status: Amended

Text of statute as originally enacted

Revised text of statute as amended

Text of the Marshall Aid Commemoration Act 1953 as in force today (including any amendments) within the United Kingdom, from legislation.gov.uk.

The commission was established by the Marshall Aid Commemoration Act 1953 (1 & 2 Eliz. 2. c. 39) of the UK Parliament, in recognition of the Marshall Plan, which had provided economic support to Western Europe (including the UK) in the aftermath of the Second World War. The principal architect of the scheme was Sir Roger Makins (1904-1996), a Deputy Under Secretary in the Foreign Office. Soon after the bill was passed by parliament Makins was appointed British Ambassador to the United States. He was subsequently ennobled as Baron Sherfield.

The commission has up to ten members, who are appointed by the British Government. The first chairman was Sir Oliver Franks (1905-1992), who had been British Ambassador to the US while the Marshall Plan was in operation. The work of the commission is administered by the Association of Commonwealth Universities.

Twelve Marshall scholarships were awarded in the first year. The number of awards increased over the years with forty new awards made in 2017. Since 1954, approximately 1,800 Marshall Scholarships have been awarded.

Marshall Sherfield Fellowships were established in 1997 for postdoctoral research. The fellowships are named after Lord Sherfield, who as Sir Roger Makins was the architect of the commission.

Total expenditure in the year to March 2016 was £2,157,267, of which 93% was funded by the UK government. Some scholarships were jointly funded from other sources.

== Marshall Scholarships ==
Marshall Scholarships are for postgraduate study by US students at UK universities. Candidates are nominated by US universities and are interviewed by eight regional committees in the US, based at the British Consulates-General and at the British Embassy in Washington DC.

The scholarships can cover courses of study from one or two years, extendable to three years. They pay university fees, a living allowance and travel from and to the US. Additional allowances are available for books and for research travel.

== Marshall Sherfield Fellowships ==
Marshall Sherfield Fellowships support up to two American postdoctoral researchers to study at a UK university or research institute.

== Marshall Medals ==
Marshall Medals are awarded every ten years by the commission, "to people of outstanding achievement whose contribution to British-American understanding, distinguished role in public life, or creative energy, reflect the legacy of George C Marshall."

== Commissioners ==
As of September 2024

- John Raine (Chair)
- Anulika Ajufo
- Dr Andrew Bell
- Professor Richard Black
- Professor Frances Brodsky
- Adrian Greer
- Professor Chris Millward
- Professor Adam Smith
- Leslie Vinjamuri
- Lady Sarah Wolffe

=== List of chairmen of the commission ===
- Sir Oliver Franks 1953–1956
- Richard Law, 1st Baron Coleraine 1956–1965
- Lord Sherfield 1965–1973
- Sir Colin Crowe 1973–1985
- Sir Donald Tebbit 1985–1995
- Dr Robert Stevens 1995–2000
- Jonathan Taylor 2000–2007
- Dr Frances Dow 2007–2011
- Dr John Hughes 2011–2016
- Christopher Fisher 2016–2021
- John Raine 2021–present
