= Karin von Hippel =

British writer and diplomat

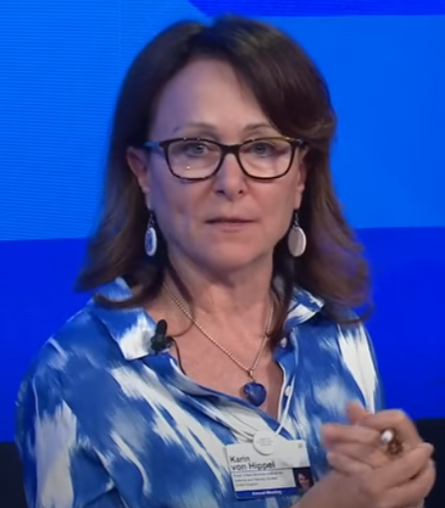
- Speaking at the 2022 World Economic Forum
- Born: Karin Lisa von Hippel; February 1965 (age 61)
- Citizenship: American; German
- Education: London School of Economics; University of Oxford; Yale University
- Occupations: Writer, diplomat

Karin Lisa von Hippel (born February 1965) is a former Director-General of the Royal United Services Institute.

== Early life ==
Karin Lisa von Hippel was born in February 1965 to Marianne and Arndt von Hippel. von Hippel grew up in Anchorage.

== Education ==
von Hippel holds a PhD from the London School of Economics, an MSt from Oxford, and a BA from Yale.

== Career ==
von Hippel worked for the United Nations and the European Union in Somalia and Kosovo.

von Hippel was a senior research fellow at the Centre for Defence Studies, King’s College London.

von Hippel co-directed the Post-Conflict Reconstruction Project at the Center for Strategic and International Studies in Washington, DC.

von Hippel was a Senior Adviser in the Bureau of Counterterrorism in the US Department of State for six years.

von Hippel was a Deputy Assistant Secretary in the Bureau of Conflict and Stabilization Operations.

von Hippel was chief of staff to General John R. Allen while he was Special Presidential Envoy for the Global Coalition to Counter-ISIL (Islamic State of Iraq and the Levant).

von Hippel was the Director-General of the Royal United Services Institute from 2015 to 2024.

== Publications ==
von Hippel is the author of Democracy by Force: US Military Intervention in the Post-Cold War World (2000).ISBN 9780521659550
