= Jeffrey Rosensweig =

Jeffrey A. Rosensweig is the director of the John Robson Program for Business, Public Policy, and Government at Goizueta Business School of Emory University. Previously, he served as associate dean for corporate relations during a six-year tenure. Rosensweig was selected by The Wall Street Journal as one of the top 12 professors in Executive MBA programs worldwide.

Rosensweig has published papers in academic journals such as the Journal of International Money and Finance, the Journal of Business and Economic Statistics, the Journal of Development Economics, and Economic Inquiry. His first book, Winning the Global Game: A Strategy for Linking People and Profits, published by The Free Press of Simon & Schuster, received critical acclaim. His third book, Age Smart, was published by Pearson Prentice-Hall.

Rosensweig is the vice president for international of the Rotary Club of Atlanta. This club comprises 500 of Metro Atlanta's most influential leaders. He is the Global Economic Advisor for one of the world's leading charities, MAP (Medical Assistance Program) International, he is a Faculty Fellow and board member for the Emory University Ethics Center, and he is on the board of advisors for the Emory University Brain Health Center.

Education

Professor Rosensweig received his M.A. and B.A. summa cum laude from Yale University. He received a master's degree in philosophy, politics, and economics from Oxford University, where he studied as a Marshall Scholar. The British Government has selected him as chairman of the Marshall Scholarship Selection Committee for the Southeast. He received his PhD in economics from M.I.T. Prior to Emory, Rosensweig worked for the Federal Reserve Bank of Atlanta, the Government of Jamaica, and taught briefly at Yale University.
