= Oldham v Kyrris =

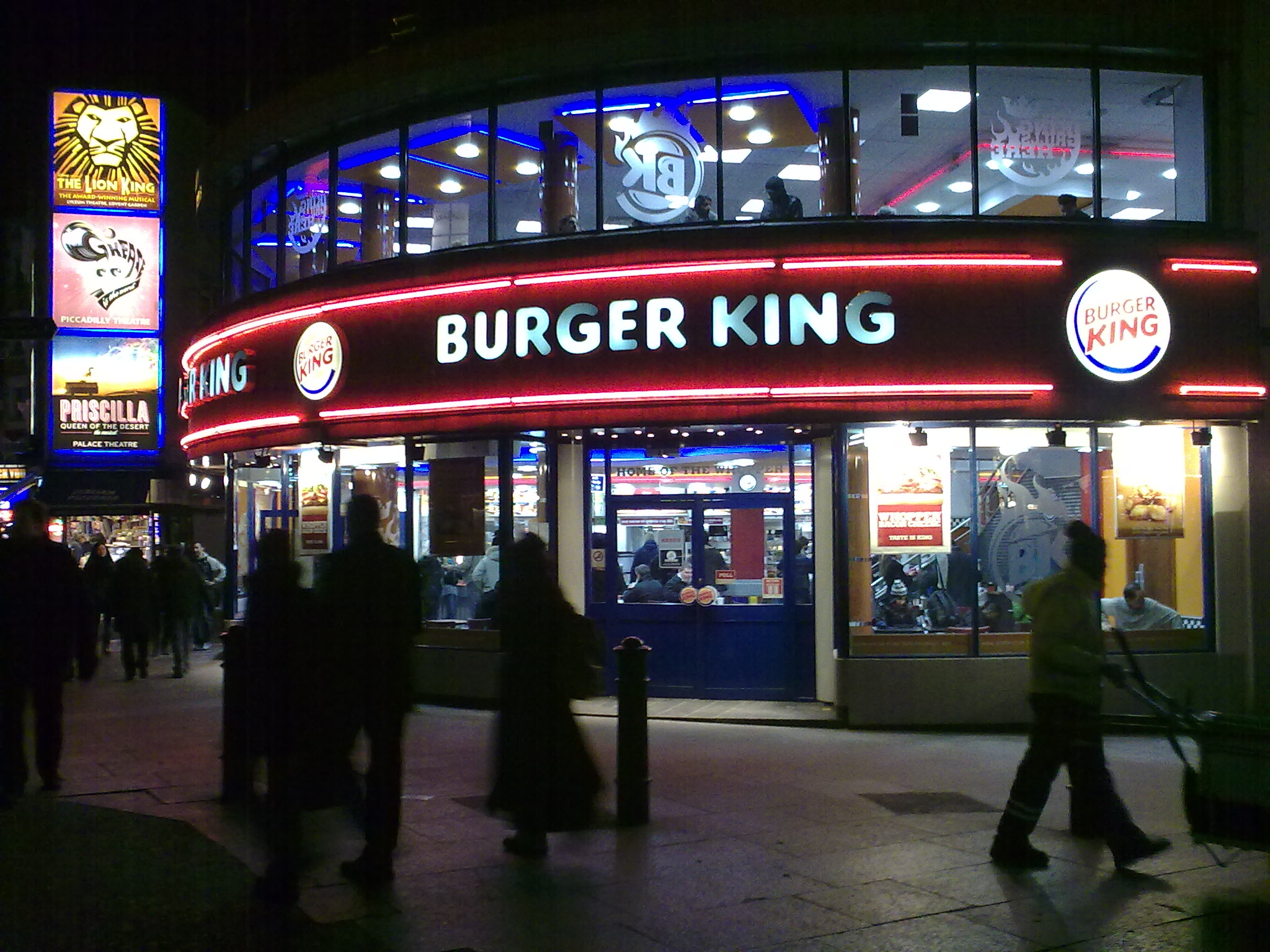
- Court: Court of Appeal
- Citation: [2003] EWCA Civ 1506, [2004] BCC 111

Keywords
- Administration

Oldham v Kyrris [2003] EWCA Civ 1506 is a UK insolvency law case concerning the administration procedure when a company is unable to repay its debts.

== Facts ==
Mr Michael Oldham was appointed by the court as administrator of Mr Jack Kyrris’ partnership. Kyrris had operated 13 Burger King restaurants, including two on Angel Row and Upper Parliament Street, Nottingham. Mr Mario Royle was an employee who sought a secured equitable charge, granted by Kyrris, for work he had done, but had not yet been paid. This amounted to £270,000. A summary judgment was given to Mr Oldham, and Mr Royle cross appealed that Mr Oldham was in breach of a duty of care, and there was sufficient proximity to him were he an unsecured creditor. He said the failure to ensure sums were paid to him was a breach of duty.

Behrens J said the equitable charge point was good enough to go to trial, and gave summary judgment for Oldham on the duty of care point.

== Judgment ==
Jonathan Parker LJ said that any equitable charge was a matter for trial and there was no sufficient proximity between administrators and unsecured creditors. The duty of an administrator is owed to the company, and no special duty was assumed. So under neither of the leading tort cases, Caparo v Dickman nor Henderson v Merrett, would the position differ. This was analogous to the company law case on directors' duties, Peskin v Anderson where Mummery LJ said that fiduciary duties are owed exclusively by directors to the company, and not to shareholders individually. Outside duties can arise, but ‘are dependent on establishing a special factual relationship between the directors and the shareholders in the particular case.’ He also noted Insolvency Act 1986, section 212, allowing the court to compel an administrator to repay money as the court thinks just, or contribute sums to the company’s assets for misfeasance, or beach of fiduciary duty or other duty as the court thinks just.

The alternative claim in negligence

141 In my judgment it matters not whether one adopts the approach of the House of Lords in Caparo Industries plc v Dickman, or the ‘assumption of responsibility’ approach which it adopted in Henderson v Merrett Syndicates: on either approach the result is the same, namely that, absent some special relationship, an administrator appointed under the 1986 Act owes no general common law duty of care to unsecured creditors in relation to his conduct of the administration.

142 In paras 31–34 of his judgment in Peskin v Anderson, Mummery LJ said this:

‘31 … [Counsel for the directors] accepted that the fiduciary duties owed by the directors to the company do not necessarily preclude, in special circumstances, the coexistence of additional duties owed by the directors to the shareholders. In such cases individual shareholders may bring a direct action, as distinct from a derivative action, against the directors for breach of fiduciary duty.

32. A duality of duties may exist. In Stein v Blake [1998] BCC 316 at pp. 318 and 320 Millett LJ recognised that there may be special circumstances in which a fiduciary duty is owed by a director to a shareholder personally and in which breach of such a duty has caused loss to him directly (e.g. by being induced by a director to part with his shares in the company at an undervalue), as distinct from loss sustained by him by a diminution in the value of his shares (e.g. by reason of the misappropriation by a director of the company's assets), for which he (as distinct from the company) would not have a cause of action against the director personally.

33. The fiduciary duties owed to the company arise from the legal relationship between the directors and the company directed and controlled by them. The fiduciary duties owed to the shareholders do not arise from that legal relationship. They are dependent on establishing a special factual relationship between the directors and the shareholders in the particular case. Events may take place which bring the directors of the company into direct and close contact with the shareholders in a manner capable of generating fiduciary obligations, such as a duty of disclosure of material facts to the shareholders, or an obligation to use confidential information and valuable commercial and financial opportunities, which have been acquired by the directors in that office, for the benefit of the shareholders, and not to prefer and promote their own interests at the expense of the shareholders.

34. These duties may arise in special circumstances which replicate the salient features of well established categories of fiduciary relationships. Fiduciary relationships, such as agency, involve duties of trust, confidence and loyalty. Those duties are, in general, attracted by and attached to a person who undertakes, or who, depending on all the circumstances, is treated as having assumed, responsibility to act on behalf of, or for the benefit of, another person. That other person may have entrusted or, depending on all the circumstances, may be treated as having entrusted, the care of his property, affairs, transactions or interests to him. There are, for example, instances of the directors of a company making direct approaches to, and dealing with, the shareholders in relation to a specific transaction and holding themselves out as agents for them in connection with the acquisition or disposal of shares; or making material representations to them; or failing to make material disclosure to them of insider information in the context of negotiations for a take-over of the company's business; or supplying to them specific *146 information and advice on which they have relied. These events are capable of constituting special circumstances and of generating fiduciary obligations, especially in those cases in which the directors, for their own benefit, seek to use their position and special inside knowledge acquired by them to take improper or unfair advantage of the shareholders.’

143 It has not been suggested (nor could it be, in my judgment) that there is any relevant distinction for present purposes between a fiduciary duty and a common law duty of care. Further, I accept Miss Hilliard's submission that the position of an administrator appointed under the 1986 Act vis-à-vis creditors is directly analogous to that of a director vis-à-vis shareholders.

144 Section 8(2) of the 1986 Act defines an administration order as:

‘… an order directing that, during the period for which the order is in force, the affairs, business and property of the company shall be managed by a person (“the administrator”) appointed for the purpose by the court.’

145 Section 14(1) of the 1986 Act confers on an administrator a number of specific powers of management set out in Sch. 1, including (in para.14) a power to carry on the business of the company, together with a general power:

‘… to do all such things as may be necessary for the management of the affairs, business and property of the company’.

146 Given the nature and scope of an administrator's powers and duties, I can for my part see no basis for concluding that an administrator owes a duty of care to creditors in circumstances where a director would not owe such a duty to shareholders. In each case the relevant duties are, absent special circumstances, owed exclusively to the company.

147 It is also material, in my judgment, to consider the nature of the remedy provided by s.212 of the 1986 Act. Section 212(3) provides that on an application under the section the court may compel an administrator (among others):

‘(a) to repay, restore or account for the money or property or any part of it, with interest at such rate as the court thinks just, or (b) to contribute such sum to the company's assets by way of compensation in respect of the misfeasance or breach of fiduciary or other duty as the court thinks just.’

148 To my mind, this is a further indication that, absent some special relationship of the kind described by Mummery LJ in Peskin v Anderson, an administrator owes no general duty to creditors.

149 My conclusion is also consistent with Romer J's decision in Knowles v Scott [1891] 1 Ch 717, where he held that a liquidator is not a trustee for the creditors or contributories of a company in liquidation. At p.723 Romer J said this:

‘In my view a voluntary liquidator is more rightly described as the agent of the company – an agent who has no doubt cast upon him by statute or otherwise special duties … If this be the true position of a liquidator, and I think at any rate agency more nearly defines his true position than trusteeship, it is clear that he could not as agent be sued by a third party for negligence apart from misfeasance or personal misconduct.’

Dyson LJ and Thorpe LJ agreed.

== See also ==
- UK insolvency law
