= National Westminster Bank Ltd v Halesowen Presswork & Assemblies Ltd =

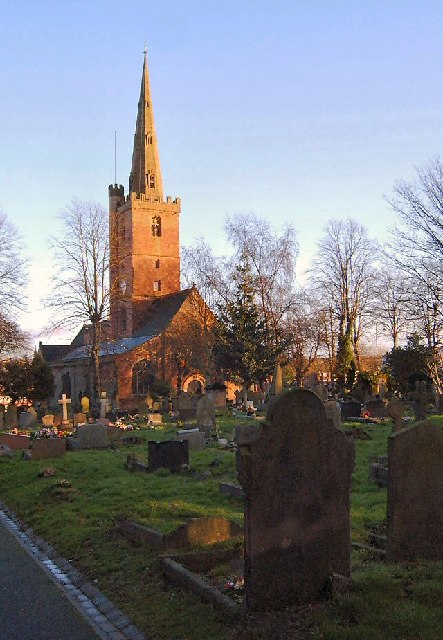
- Halesowen
- Court: House of Lords
- Decided: 26 January 1972
- Citations: [1972] AC 785 [1972] 2 WLR 455 [1972] 1 All ER 641 [1972] 1 Lloyd' Rep 101 (1972) 116 SJ 138

Case history
- Appealed from: [1971] 1 QB 1 (CA)

Court membership
- Judges sitting: Lord Donovan; Viscount Dilhorne; Lord Simon of Glaisdale; Lord Cross of Chelsea; Lord Kilbrandon

Case opinions
- Decision by: Viscount Dilhorne
- Concurrence: Lord Simon of Glaisdale and Lord Kilbrandon
- Dissent: Lord Cross of Chelsea (in part)

Keywords
- set-off, insolvency, banker's right to combine accounts

National Westminster Bank Ltd v Halesowen Presswork & Assemblies Ltd [1972] AC 785 is a decision of the House of Lords in relation to a banker's right to combine accounts under English law. It is the leading English case on the point, and also an important decision relating to insolvency set-off.

The case was decided in relation to section 31 of the Bankruptcy Act 1914 (which applied to companies by virtue of section 317 of the Companies Act 1948). Today those provisions have been replaced by section 323 of the Insolvency Act 1986 and rule 14.25 of the Insolvency Rules (England and Wales) 2016 (formerly rule 4.90 of the Insolvency Rules 1986), but the decision is still treated as authoritative.

== Facts ==
Halesowen Assembly & Pressworks Ltd was a small company based in Halesowen, West Midlands. They had an account with National Westminster Bank which in February 1968 was overdrawn by £11,339. The bank was concerned, and a meeting was held. An agreement was reached whereby the bank account (which was to be called the "No. 1 account") would be frozen, and a new account (the "No. 2 account") would be opened. All of the company's business would go through the No. 2 account, which needed to kept in credit. The bank agreed that that arrangement should continue for four months "in the absence of materially changed circumstances in the meantime."

On 20 May 1968 the company gave the bank notice of a meeting of creditors to be held on 12 June under sections 294 and 295 of the Companies Act 1948. The bank did not rely on that notice as constituting a material change of circumstances within the terms of their agreement. On 12 June the company paid into the No. 2 account a cheque for £8,611. Later that day, a resolution was passed at the creditors' meeting for the voluntary winding up of the company. The cheque was credited to the No. 2 account on 13 June and cleared on 14 June. In the liquidation, the bank claimed to be entitled to set off the £8,611 against the company's indebtedness on the No. 1 account. The liquidator did not accept that the bank was entitled to set-off in this manner, and the liquidator (through the company) brought an action against the bank.

== Lower courts ==
At trial Roskill J held in favour of the bank. In the Court of Appeal that decision was reversed (Buckley LJ dissenting). The bank appealed to the House of Lords.

== Death of Lord Donovan ==
The hearing began with Lord Donovan in the chair, but he fell ill and was unable to continue. The parties both consented to continue with just four judges. Lord Donovan would actually die of his illness on 12 December 1971 before the judgment in the case was handed down.

== Decision ==
All four judges gave written opinions, and all agreed that the appeal should be allowed.

In relation to the nature of the banker's right to combine accounts, the judgments all confirmed that this was in the nature of set-off, and not a part of the law relating to a banker's lien. A party could not have a lien over their own property. A bank could agree not to exercise the right to combine accounts and that agreement would be binding upon the bank. However, that agreement was subject to termination if there was a change of circumstances. In this case the company's creditors voting to put the company into winding-up was such a change of circumstances.

On the question of whether insolvency set-off would prevail over other contractual arrangements, it was noted that there were conflicting prior authorities. In Rolls Razor Ltd v Cox [1967] 1 QB 552 and in In re City Life Assurance Co Ltd [1926] Ch 191 it had been held that a party could not contract out of the insolvency set-off regime. However, this appeared to conflict with decisions in Ex parte Fletcher, In re Vaughan (1877) 6 Ch D 350 and British Guiana Bank Ltd v Official Receiver (1911) 27 TLR 45. However, the majority led by Viscount Dilhorne held that the operation of the insolvency set-off rules was automatic and mandatory upon the commencement of winding-up. On this point Lord Cross of Chelsea dissented.

== Authority ==
The main authority for which the case is cited is the definitive determination of the underlying nature of the right of a banker to combine accounts.

The decision was also treated as authoritative of the majority view that the insolvency set-off provisions were mandatory and that a party could not waive them or contract out of them. This position has now been affirmed by the subsequent (unanimous) House of Lords' decisions in Stein v Blake [1996] AC 243 and Re Bank of Credit and Commerce International SA (No 8) [1998] AC 214.
