= Financial law =

Legal rules relating to financial instruments and financial assets

Financial law is the law and regulation of the commercial banking, capital markets, insurance, derivatives and investment management sectors. Understanding financial law is crucial to appreciating the creation and formation of banking and financial regulation, as well as the legal framework for finance generally.

Financial law forms a substantial portion of commercial law, and notably a substantial proportion of the global economy, and legal billables are dependent on sound and clear legal policy pertaining to financial transactions. Therefore financial law as the law for financial industries involves public and private law matters. Understanding the legal implications of transactions and structures such as an indemnity, or overdraft is crucial to appreciating their effect in financial transactions. This is the core of financial law. Thus, financial law draws a narrower distinction than commercial or corporate law by focusing primarily on financial transactions, the financial market, and its participants; for example, the sale of goods may be part of commercial law but is not financial law. Financial law may be understood as being formed of three overarching methods, or pillars of law formation and categorised into five transaction silos which form the various financial positions prevalent in finance.

Financial regulation can be distinguished from financial law in that regulation sets out the guidelines, framework and participatory rules of the financial markets, their stability and protection of consumers, whereas financial law describes the law pertaining to all aspects of finance, including the law which controls party behaviour in which financial regulation forms an aspect of that law.

Financial law is understood as consisting of three pillars of law formation, these serve as the operating mechanisms on which the law interacts with the financial system and financial transactions generally. These three components, being market practices, case law, and regulation; work collectively to set a framework upon which financial markets operate. Whilst regulation experienced a resurgence following the 2008 financial crisis, the role of case law and market practices cannot be understated. Further, whilst regulation is often formulated through legislative practices; market norms and case law serve as primary architects to the current financial system and provide the pillars upon which the markets depend. It is crucial for strong markets to be capable of utilising both self-regulation and conventions as well as commercially mined case law. This must be in addition to regulation. An improper balance of the three pillars is likely to result in instability and rigidity within the market contributing to illiquidity. For example, the soft law of the Potts QC Opinion in 1997 reshaped the derivatives market and helped expand the prevalence of derivatives. These three pillars are underpinned by several legal concepts upon which financial law depends, notably, legal personality, set-off, and payment which allows legal scholars to categorise financial instruments and financial market structures into five legal silos; those being (1) simple positions, (2) funded positions, (3) asset-backed positions, (4) net positions, and (5) combined positions. These are used by academic Joanna Benjamin to highlight the distinctions between various groupings of transaction structures based on common underpinnings of treatment under the law. The five position types are used as a framework to understand the legal treatment and corresponding constraints of instruments used in finance (such as, for example, a guarantee or asset-backed security).

== Three pillars of financial law formation ==
Three different (and indeed inconsistent) regulatory projects exist which form the law within financial law. These are based on three different views of the proper nature of financial market relationships.

=== Market practices ===
The market practices in the financial field constitute a core aspect of the source of law of the financial markets, primarily within England & Wales. The actions and norms of parties in creating standard practices creates a fundamental aspect of how those parties self-regulate. These market practices create internal norms which parties abide by, correspondingly influencing legal rules which result when the market norms are either broken or are disputed through formal, court, judgments.

The principle role is to form soft-law; as a source of rules of conduct which in principle have no legally binding force but have practical effects. This has created standard form of contracts for various financial trade associations such as Loan Market Association, which seeks to set guidance, codes of practice, and legal opinions. It is these norms, particularly those provided by Financial Market Law Committees, and City of London Law Societies which the financial market operates and therefore the courts are often quick to uphold their validity. Oftentimes "soft law" defines the nature and incidents of the relationships that participants of particular types of transactions expect.

The implementation and value of soft law within the system, is particularly notable in its relationship with globalisation, consumer rights, and regulation. The FCA plays a central role in regulating the financial markets but soft law, voluntary or practice created legal schemes play a vital role. Soft law can fill market uncertainties what are produced by common law schemes. Obvious risk that that participants become lulled into believing statements of soft law is the law. However, the perception that an opinion constitutes ipso facto a clear and widely held opinion is wrong. For example, the consumer relationship in the case of Office of Fair Trading v Abbey National [2009] UKSC 6 where the bank was fined by the FSA for failing to handle complaints set out in soft law principle practices on broadly worded business principles which state that the bank must pay due regard to the interests of its customers and treat them fairly. Oftentimes the self-regulation of soft law can be problematic for consumer protection policies.

Another example of the expansiveness of soft law in the financial market is the explosion of credit derivatives in London, which has flourished on the back of the characteristically robust opinion of Potts for Allen & Overy regarding the ISDA Master Agreement in 1990 which helped the industry separate itself from current market restrictions. A the time, it was unclear whether Credit Derivatives were to be categorised as insurance contracts under English legislation of the Insurance Companies Act 1982. ISDA was firm in rejecting a statutory definition of insurance, stating that

In practice market participants have had few concerns as to the impacts of boundary issues between CD's and contracts of insurance.

This was crucial as Insurance companies were restricted from participating in other financial market activities and a licence needed to be granted to participate in the financial market. As a result of the Potts Opinion, credit derivatives were categorised as outside of insurance contracts, which allowed them to expand without the limitations set in place by insurance legislation.

Soft law has practical effects in that it is liable in many cases to be turned into "hard law", but with verified and experienced practice evidence. In the case Vanheath Turner (1622) the court remarked that custom of merchants is part of the common law of the United Kingdom. This highlights a long history of incorporating and accounting for the lex mercatoria into the English law in order to facilitate financial markets. Law merchant had been so absorbed by the 18th century that the Bills of Exchange Act 1882 could provide common law rules and merchant law in tandem. We might consider Tidal Energy Ltd v Bank of Scotland, where Lord Dyson held that "a man who employs a banker is bound by the usages of bankers", meaning that if a sort code and account number was correct, it did not matter if the name did not match.

There are risks on over-reliance on soft law sources, however. English law makes it difficult to create a type of security and reliance on rules may result in established views which reinforce errors. This could result in unacceptable security even if legally valid.

=== Case law ===
The second category which financial law draws most of its pragmatism with regard to the standards of the markets originates in litigation. Often, courts seek to reverse engineer matters to make commercially beneficial outcomes and so case law operates in a similar manner to market practice in producing efficient results.

There are two exceptions, attempting to limit the expectations to reasonable commercial men and uphold the freedom of contract. Autonomy is at the heart of commercial law and there is the strong case for autonomy in complex financial instruments. Re Bank of Credit and Commerce International SA (No 8) highlights the striking effect a commercially beneficial practice can have on financial law. Lord Hoffman upheld the validity of a security charge over a chose in action the bank held which it owed to a client. Despite the formidable conceptual problems in allowing a bank to place a charge over a debt the bank itself owed to another party, the courts have been driven to facilitate market practices as best as possible. Thus, they are careful to declare practices as conceptually impossible. In BCCI, the court held that a charge was no more than labels to self-consistent rules of law, an opinion shared Lord Goff in Clough Mill v Martin where he wrote

concepts such as bailment and fiduciary duty must not be allowed to be our masters, but tools of the trade fashioning to aspects of life

— Clough Mill v Martin [1985] 1 WLR 111, Lord Goff

Unfortunately, case coverage is unsystematic. Wholesale and international finance is patchy as a result of a preference to settle disputes through arbitration rather than through the courts. This has the potential to be detrimental to advancing the law regulating finance. Market participants generally prefer to settle disputes than litigate, this places a greater level of importance onto the "soft law" of market practices. However, in face of disaster, litigation is essential, especially surrounding major insolvencies, market collapse, wars, and frauds. The collapse of Lehman Brothers provides a good example, with 50 judgments from the English Court of Appeal and 5 from the Supreme Court of the United Kingdom. Despite these problems, there is a new breed of litigious lenders, primarily hedge funds, which has helped propel the pragmatic nature of financial case law past the 2008 crisis.

=== Regulation and legislation ===
The third category of law formation within the financial markets are those deriving from national and international regulatory and legislative regimes, which operate to regulate the practice of financial services. Three regulatory lenses ought to be highlighted namely arm's length, fiduciary, and consumerist approaches to financial relationships.

In the EU these might be exampled by MiFiD II, payment services directive, Securities settlement regulations and others which have resulted from the 2008 financial crisis or regulate financial trade. Regulatory control by the Financial Conduct Authority and the former Office of Fair Trading set out clear rules replacing extra-statutory codes of conduct and has seen recent resurgence following the 2008 financial crisis. The regulatory policies have not all been rectified in regard to how they the new rules will be coherent with current market practices. We may consider In Re Lehman Brothers [2012] EWHC(Extended liens case) where Briggs J struggled to determine the legislative intent of the Financial Collateral Directive.

==== Financial collateral regulations ====
In addition to national and cross-national regulations on finance, additional rules are put into place in order to stabilise the financial markets by reinforcing the utility of collateral. In Europe, two regimes of collateral carve-outs exist; the Financial Collateral Directive, and the Financial Collateral Arrangement (No 2) Regulations 2003. The EU's development of the Financial Collateral Directive is curious if we view it through the lens of only a regulatory matter. It is clear that the law here developed through market practice and private law statutory reform. The EU has played a substantial role in this field to induce and encourage the ease of transfer & realisation of assets and liquidity within markets. The provisions are well adapted to short term transactions such as repos or derivatives.

Further harmonisation rules pertaining to commercial conflict of laws matters were clarified. The additional Geneva Securities Convention set by UNIDROIT provides a basic framework for minimum harmonised provisions governing rights conferred by the credit of securities to an account with an intermediary. However, this international project has as of late been ineffective with only Bangladesh signing.

== Legal concepts prevalent in financial law ==
Several legal concepts underpin the law of finance. Of these, perhaps the most central concept is that of legal personality, the idea that the law can create non-natural persons is one of the most important common myths and among the most ingenious inventions for financial practice because it facilitates the ability to limit risk by creating legal persons which are separate. Other legal concepts, such as set-off and payment are crucial to preventing systemic risk by lessening the level of gross exposure of credit risk a financial participant might be exposed to on any given transaction. This is often mitigated through the use of collateral. If financial law is centrally concerned with the law pertaining to financial instruments or transactions, then it can be said that the legal effect of those transactions is to allocate risk.

=== Limited liability and legal personality ===
A limited liability company is an artificial creation of legislature which operates to limit the level of credit risk and exposure a person, natural or legal, will participate within. Lord Sumption summarised the position by stating

Subject to very limited exceptions, most of which are statutory, a company is a legal entity distinct from its shareholders. It has rights and liabilities of its own which are distinct from those of its shareholders. Its property is its own, and not that of its shareholders [...] [T]hese principles appl[y] as much to a company that [i]s wholly owned and controlled by one man as to any other company

For financial markets, the allocation of financial risk through separate legal personality allows for parties to participate in financial contracts and transfer credit risk between parties. The ambition of measuring the likelihood of future loss, that is of identifying risk, is a central part of the role legal liability plays in economics. Risk is a crucial part of financial market sectors:

[I]t is not just legally but economically fundamental, since limited companies have been the principal unit of commercial life for more than a century. Their separate personality and property are the basis on which third parties are entitled to deal with them and commonly do deal with them.

=== Financial collateral ===
Financial markets have developed particular methods for taking security in relation to transactions, this is because collateral operates as a central method for parties to mitigate the credit risk of transacting with others. Derivatives frequently utilise collateral to secure transactions. Large notional exposures can be reduced to smaller, single net amounts. Often, these are designed to mitigate the credit risk one party is exposed to. Two forms of financial collateralization have been developed from the Lex Mercatoria;

1. Title transfer; or
2. By granting a security interest

A security interest may be granted with a right of use, conferring disposal powers. There is an increasing reliance on collateral in financial markets, and in particular, this is driven by regulatory margin requirements set out for derivatives transactions and financial institution borrowing from the European Central Bank. The higher the collateral requirements, the greater demand for quality exists. For lending, it is generally regarded that there are three criteria for determining high-quality collateral. Those being assets which are or can be:

- Liquid; and
- Easily priced; and
- Of Low credit risk

There are several benefits to having financial collateral provisions. Namely, financial reduces credit risk, meaning the cost of credit and the cost of transacting will be lowered. The reduced insolvency risk of the counter-party, combined with more credit being available to the collateral taker will mean the collateral taker can take additional risk without having to rely on a counter-party. Systemic risk will be reduced by increased liquidity, This produces "knock-on effects" by increasing the number of transactions a collateral taker can safely enter, freeing up capital for other uses. However, there is a need for balance; the removal of limitations on insolvency rules and security registration requirements, as observed in the FCARs, is dangerous as it degrades powers and protections which have been conferred deliberately by the law.

==== Financial collateral regulations ====
The primary objective of the Financial Collateral Directive was to reduce systemic risk, harmonise transactions and reduce legal uncertainty. It achieved this by exempting qualified "Financial collateral arrangements" from the performance of formal legal requirements; notably registration and notification. Second, the collateral taker is provided effective right of use and said arrangements are exempted from being re-characterised as different security arrangements. Perhaps most significantly, traditional insolvency rules which may invalidate a financial collateral arrangement; such as freezing assets upon entering into insolvency, are suspended. This allows a collateral taker to act without the limitation which may arise from a collateral provider entering bankruptcy. The FCARs focus on outlining when a financial collateral arrangement will be exempted from national insolvency and registration rules. In England, the requirements that a financial collateral arrangements only applies between non-natural persons with one being a financial institution, central bank, or public body; the FCAR has been "gold-platted" by allowing any non-natural person to benefit. Thus, to qualify as a "financial collateral arrangement" under the FCARs, a transaction must be in writing and regard "relevant financial obligations". The criteria for a "relevant financial obligations" is set out in Part I Paragraph 3

Security financial collateral arrangement mean[s] any agreement or arrangement, evidenced in writing, where -
- (a) the purpose of the agreement or arrangement is to secure the relevant financial obligations vowed to the collateral-taker,
- (b) Collateral Provider creates or there arises a "security interest in financial collateral" to secure those obligations;
- (c) FC is delivered, transferred, held, registered, or otherwise designated so as to be in the possession or under the control of the Collateral Taker; any right of the Collateral Provider to substitute equivalent financial collateral or withdraw excess, financial collateral shall not prevent the financial collateral being in the possession or under the control of the Collateral Taker; and
- (d) Collateral Provider and Collateral Taker are both non-natural persons

The purpose of the provision is to increase the efficiency of markets and lower the transaction costs. The disapplied formal and perfection requirements accelerates the effectiveness of security through FCAR Reg 4(1),(2),(3) and 4(4). Two things might be said of this. Firstly, academics have highlighted the risk of dappling statute of frauds and other requirements. It runs real risk of repealing substantial protections which were developed, at least in English common law, because of real risks of exploitation. Other forms of protection which has been repealed includes the ability to allow parties to implement Appropriation if expressly agreed is permitted.

Extensive litigation has resulted from the determination of the FCAR regulations, specifically the meaning of "possession or control" as set out in paragraph 3. Recital 10 states that possession or control is for the safety of third parties, however, the type of mischief this is seeking to remove is unclear. In C-156/15 Swedbank, the CJEU enforced the requirement that practical control was that of legal negative control.

second sentence of Article 2(2) provides that any right of substation or to withdraw excess financial collateral in favour of the collateral provider must not prejudice the FC having been provided to the collateral taker. That right would lack any force if the taker of collateral consisting in monies deposited in a bank account were also to be regarded as having acquired "possession or control" of the monies where the account holder may freely dispose of them […] it follows that the taker of collateral in the form of money lodged in an ordinary bank account may be regarded as having acquired 'possession or control' of the monies only if the collateral provider is prevented from disposing of them.

What is clear is that (1) possession is more than merely custodial and dispossession is mandatory. Some legal control is also crucial, meaning practical or administrative control is insufficient.

===== Possession =====
Requirement that collateral must be in possession is unclear. Is it one, two things? Does possession apply to intangibles? We do know that you cant. Is the requirement of control the same as the test for fixed charges. The scope of the regime is not clear. There are several unanswered questions. Only the collateral providers can have is right of substitution and right to withdraw surplus. Possession applies to intigble if it is credited to an account. Gullifer suggests that this is a redundant definition. The directive drafted with English and Irish laws not being centrally in mind. It was about disposition. To some extent, ownership discourages transactions for the risk of ostensible wealth.

It was held that the phrase was to be construed in a manner consistent with meaning and purpose. This is not merely a matter of English law, Lord Briggs' judgment in Client Money [2009] EWHC 3228 held that to interpret the meaning of the directive a court ought to 1. Interpret the directive. We can look at different language texts and cases if any. 2. Interpret domestic legislation in light of the directive (as interpreted through stage 1) This is not restricted by conventional rules. Meaning that the court can and will depart from literal meaning and may imply words as necessary however, one cannot go against domestic legislation, nor require the court to make decisions it is not prepared to make. Repercussions must be and are considered by the court.

===== Control =====
By contrast, Control has been shown to not be that of practical (Administrative) control. It is clear that FCARs require a standard of negative legal control. Practical control, is the Collateral Taker's exclusive ability to dispose and it is suggested this will additionally be required if the parties are to avoid fraud. It is established by the rights and prohibitions in the security agreement but there is limited case-law on the matter Scholars identify two forms of control:

- positive
- negative (Collateral Provider has no rights in relation to dealing with or disposal of collateral)

Positive and Negative control differ where one either has the right to dispose without reference to the collateral provider, or where collateral provider is able to do so without collateral taker. What is undeniable however, is that dispossession is central to both possession and control. Rights of the Collateral taker must be beyond merely custodial; he must be able to refuse to hand collateral back.

There are a handful of risks to these arrangements - as previously outlined - the ill definition of what constitutes the activation of the FCAR arrangements creates a danger. However, within the context of appropriation, a provider only has a personal right against a taker for the surplus. There is no proprietary right. Should a taker (like Lehman) become insolvent, a provider may well be at a loss for the excess. It encourages the party to reclaim excess value whenever possible/reasonably practical. This is not always possible due to the variation of the markets. Further, the risk of appropriation is that these can be used for ulterior purposes. Which as created the Cukurova problem; there parties had constructed a scheme to capture shares with a clause preventing the collateral taker from selling large securities at once and spooking the market, but valuation is not linear which made it difficult, if not impossible to determine what a commercially reasonable price for securities would be in an illiquid market.

=== Set off ===
Other concepts, crucial to financial markets include contingent obligations, the fact that bank debts operate as money; and set-off designed to mitigate the net exposure of transactions. Set-off as a legal concept is crucial part of reducing credit risk and reducing the knock-on effects of insolvency. Collectively, these concepts operate to underpin financial transactions by further dividing risk. Various combinations of these legal methods are used to produce various allocations of risk. For example, the ISDA 2002 master agreement utilises contingent obligations, set-off, and legal personality to reduce the liabilities of non-defaulting parties in the event of default. The effect of Clause 2(a)(iii) of the ISDA agreement is to suspend the payment obligations of parties until the event of default has been cured. Such a cure may not ever occur. There is substantial academic caution that such a suspension acts to circumvent insolvency pari passu objectives. However, there is equal evidence that the clause provides substantial market stability as a result of the standardisation and universality that the ISDA Master Agreement has within the derivatives market. It further provides the involved parties to suspend the swap (and any other transactions within the master agreement), providing them the time to understand the overall effect the event of default has had on the agreement and the market. In other words, it provides a breather.

=== Payment ===
Payment operates as another core legal concept which underpins financial law. It is crucial because it determines the point at which a party discharges their obligation to another party. In finance, particularly relating to set-off, guarantees, or other simple and funded positions; the definition of payment is crucial to determining the legal exposure of parties. Several of the cases derive predominately from English and U.S. law, pertaining to the Lex mercatoria, and was developed when financial law historically focused on maritime trade.

In English and U.S. law, payment is consensual, requiring acceptance from both payee and payer. Roy Goode suggests that Payment is a;

consensual act and thus requires the accord of both creditor and debtor

— Roy Goode, Goode on Legal Problems of Credit and Security (Sweet & Maxwell, 6th ed 2013

. Payment as a legal concept is underpinned by the law of contract. In most common law jurisdictions, a valid contract requires sufficient consideration. Payment plays a crucial role in financial law because it determines when parties are able to discharge duties. In Lomas v JFB Firth Rixson Inc [2012] EWCA Civ 419, the issue concerned when a debtor was able to discharge the duty to pay under the ISDA Master Agreement (1992). The requirement for payment arises in English law from a duty in performance of a money obligation. Whilst normally described and fulfilled in monetary terms, payment need only satisfy the creditor and does not necessarily involve the delivery of money, but it cannot constitute payment unless money is involved, even if performance is fulfilled by some other act.

a gift or loan of money or any act offered and accepted in performance of a money obligation.

— Brindle and Cox, Law of Bank Payments (Sweet & Maxwell, 4th ed, 2010), [1-001]

Obligation to pay or tender the debt is balanced by the obligation on the part of the seller not to refuse the whole or part of the debt. This is underpinned by limitations on part-payment. This traditionally operates in order to proffering money to fulfil obligations within a contract. In taking it, it is an affirmation of said contract and the debtor is discharged of his obligation to the creditor. This is crucial. In contracts where A ('the debtor') owes money to B ('the creditor'), payment operates as the terminus for A's obligation to B. It was crucially held in Societe des Hotel Le Touquet Paris-Plage v Cummings that the bilateral contractual process did not require "accord and satisfaction" to achieve discharge of a debt by payment. The operation of payment therefore requires mutual compliance from "both creditor and debtor".

==== Two conceptual points of mutual consent ====
Mutual consent must thus occur at two points, ex ante and ex post of the contract between parties and at what we might call "point Z" for situations where an obligation to pay does not result from contractual duties. (such as a debt owed to a non-adjusting creditor, cf Bebchuk and Fried). At both points, mutual consent required from both parties. First, ex ante consent occurs at the time where parties agree on the obligation. If a party has specified a method for discharging an obligation through a specific means, then the parties must have contemplated the sufficiency of the tender to discharge the debt and therefore consensually agreed to payment of a specified way. This will likely provide specification on when tender may be rejected. Chen-Wishart's discussion of the importance of consideration within the bargain theory of contracts enunciates the emphasis the English law has placed on benefit and deliberateness when contracting. Contracting parties must have contemplated, negotiated, and reached mutual agreement in regard to how the obligation would be discharged. This does not, however, prevent or impede the occurrence of "point Z". Parties may duly agree on payment in principle prior to the execution of the contract and subsequently still fail to effect payment. Functionally agreement results in questioning whether or not payment has been made by the debtor. The debtor must commit a certain level of formality to proffering the obligation. This formality may take the form of complying with a contract. Failure to comply, is not payment.

Second, ex post, regardless of whether parties have mutually agreed and specified a method, or a money of payment, the parties (notably the creditor) must consent to the debtor's tender in order to crystallise payment and sever the demand for payment. Discharge of a debt is automatic. In other words, a payment of a contractual obligation requires mutual consent of payment at both the stage of formation and at the conclusion/distribution to be recognised as 'payment', but upon acceptance of payment the debt is discharged. In Colley v Overseas Exporters it was shown that even where tender complies with the contract, it is not payment until the creditor (or Payer) accepts. This is regardless of whether the creditor's rejection frustrates the contract and is a breach of their duty. The law does not allow the debtor to coerce the creditor into accepting a tender. This is the case, even when the debtor has forwarded valid tender. It is the subsequent acceptance or non-acceptance of the tender from the creditor which crystallises payment and effects discharge. Mere receipt will not suffice. However, mutual consent is of a lower standard than that in contractual formation. In TSB Bank of Scotland plc v Welwyn Hatfield District Council [1993] Bank LR 267, Hobhouse J held that acceptance of payment need not be communicated and his judgment provides a clear, two-stage test for determining whether payment has been made. If A;

- places the money unconditionally at the disposal of his creditor; and
- the conduct of the creditor, viewed objectively, amounts to acceptance, then payment has passed.

Thus, in Libyan Arab Bank v Bankers Trust Co the court held that when the collecting bank decided unconditionally to credit the creditor's account, the payment is completed. Presentation and subsequent rejection of payment provides an absolute defence for to an action brought by the creditor, but without the action (and opportunity to pay into the court) and with exceptions, the debtor's proffering of payment does not discharge the money obligation nor does it constitute as payment. In the case of The Laconia, the English House of Lords set out clear conditions on timing of payment in relation to the debtor proffering payment. The charterers had procured a vessel for 3 months, 15 days with a payment due on April 12, a Sunday. The charterers delivered payment on Monday. The vessel owners rejected the payment, which was sent back the following day. Primarily, The Laconia regards the requirement for a tender to be congruent with the conditions in order to amount to a tendering of payment. However, the case might also be used to highlight the necessity for the creditor to accept such tendering. Had the vessel owners merely taken receipt of the payment and not instructed their bank to return the money, then it seems likely that payment was accepted. The consensual nature of payment thus derives from the requirement that both debtor must offer, and creditor must accept, the medium of payment; and secondly from the fact that creditor rejection of procurement, even if his agent is in receipt of the payment, results in a failure to effect payment. Goode discusses two forms where receipt does not take effect as acceptance that fall into the second aforementioned stage of mutual consent;

1. Conditional acceptance. Where a cheque is accepted it is conditional on such a cheque being met. Here, letters of Credit come to mind in that their conditional nature is dependent on the bank effecting payment. In The Chikuma and The Brimnes the court examined whether payment was fulfilled on the side of the payer. From that perspective, it was necessary for the court to analyse whether the payer had fulfilled the conditions in order to effect discharge.
2. Receipt by creditor's agent. The Laconia falls within this category. This is primarily because it is not always clear whether the agent lacked the authority to accept the payment.

The fact that rejection of tender is sufficient to prevent 'payment' derives from the fact that payment is the conferral of property to fulfil the obligation. Property and obligation aspects of the transaction cannot be separated without the transaction ceasing to be "payment".

== Financial law transactional categories ==
As well as being fragmented, financial law is often muddled. Historical segregation of the industry into sectors has meant each has been regulated and conducted by different institutions. The approach to financial law is unique depending on the structure of the financial instrument. The historical development of various financial instruments explains the legal protections which differ between, say, guarantees and indemnities. Due to the limited cross-sectoral legal awareness, innovations in finance have been associated with varying levels of risk. Several different legal "wrappers" provide different structured products, each with differing levels of risk allocation, for example, funded positions consist of bank loans, capital market securities, and managed funds.

The primary purpose of financial law is to allocate risk from one person to another and change the nature of risk being run by the protection buyer into the 'credit risk' of the risk taker. Five categories of market structures are divided according to how the contract deals with the credit risk of the risk taker.

=== Simple financial positions ===
Guarantees, insurance, standby letters of credit and performance bonds. The terms Simple can often be misleading, as often the transactions which fall within this category are often complicated. They are termed simple not because of the lack of sophistication but because the transactions do not address the credit exposure of the protection buyer. Rather, as with a guarantee, the protection buyer simply takes the risk of protection seller. Derivatives often fall within this regulatory category because they transfer risk from one party to another.

==== Derivatives law ====
The second portion of simple transactions are derivatives, specifically unfunded derivatives of which, four basic types exist. At law, the primary risk of a derivative is the risk of a transaction being re-characterised as another legal structure. Thus, the courts have been cautious to make clear definitions of what amounts to a derivative at law. Fundamentally, a derivative is a contract for difference, it utilises netting to set obligations between parties. Rarely does delivery of the asset occur. In English law, the judgment of Lomas v JFB Firth Rixson [2012] EWCA Civ, quotes the leading test Firth on Derivatives, characterising a derivative as a

transaction under which the future obligations are linked to another asset or index. Delivery of the asset is calculated by reference to said asset. Derives from the value of the underlying asset. This creates another asset out of the first type. It is a chose in action with reference to the value of the underlying asset. They are separate and can be traded accordingly

As legal instruments, derivatives are bilateral contracts which rights and obligations of the parties are derived from, or defined by, reference to a specified asset type, entity, or benchmark and the performance of which is agreed to take place on a date significantly later than the date in which the contract is concluded.

Types Various types of derivatives exist with even greater variance of reference assets. English law in particular has been clear to distinguish between two types of basic derivatives: Forwards and Options. Often parties will place limits on the interest rate differentials when engaging in trades. At law, these are known as "Caps & Collars", these reduce the cost of the transaction. Regulation has been a key component in making the market more transparent, this has been particularly useful in protecting small and medium sized businesses.

Swaps and Credit derivatives also differ in legal function. A credit derivative describes various contracts designed to assume or distribute credit risk on loans or other financial instruments. Payment obligations of a seller is triggered by specified credit events affective defined assets or entities. In a swap, it was held in Hazell v Hammersmith and Fulham London Borough Council by Woolf LJ that equity swaps were developed under ISDA's guidance and might be defined as

A transaction in which one party pays periodic amounts of a currency based on a fixed price/rate and the other party pays periodic amounts of the same currency or different currency based on the performance of a share of an issuer, an index or a basket of several issuers.

These are differentiated from credit derivatives, which reference the credit risk of specified credit event; usually a bankruptcy, failure to make payment, or a breach of a condition such as a debt-to-equity ratio. Payment as a core concept in finance is crucial to the operation of derivatives. Credit derivatives which are "self-referenced", i.e. referencing the parties own credit worthiness have been considered by the courts as capable of involving fraud.

===== Legal issues =====
A swap derivative with negative interest rates highlights particularly issues at law. It is unclear how a party pays a negative number. Does it reverse the obligations? According to the ISDA Master Agreement variation in 2006, a swap has a "zero floor" which means that if interest rates reverse, the obligations do not reverse. Without the 2006 variation, the negative interest rate is a deduction off what is owed. An additional area of relevant derivatives law is shown in the cases of Dharmala and Peekay, both of which involved arguments of mis-selling derivative transactions. This is closely related with the argument that parties, particularly government bodies lack the power to enter into derivative contracts. In Dharmala, the claimant argued unsuccessfully that the bank misrepresented the transaction. It was held that they did misrepresent but for the misrepresentation to effect a claim, it was necessary to induce someone to enter into the contract, which was unable to be proven. In Peekay, the Court of Appeal rejected the suit for misrepresentation when the defendant mis-sold a synthetic credit derivative to Peekay which had its reference assets in Russian investments. The Peekay director ought to have read the documents rather than relying on the defendant's oral representation. This is a pro-market approach with marked Judaical disinclination to not strike down transactions, substantial problems exist with enforcing a contract against a party which argues it lacks the power to enter into an agreement, it has been likened to pulling oneself up by the bootstraps as the party cannot warrant that it has the power if it truly does not.

Documentation of derivatives often utilises standard forms to increase liquidity, this is particularly the case in exchange traded, or "over the counter" derivatives which are predominately documented using the ISDA Master Agreement. These agreements operate to create a singular transaction which lasts the duration of the trading relationship. Confirmation of trades can be codified by oral contracts made over the phone. This is only possible because interpretation of the standard form documentation is done in a manner so that the terms of art used within the documents have their own autonomous meaning separate from the law of the forum. Flexibility within the contract, and a court appreciation for the commercial objectives of the master agreements is a crucial aspect of the long-term operation of the financial markets which they support. The ISDA Master Agreement is dependent on market practices, which attach to interpretations of intention within a context of long term relationships. The aim is to differentiate relational contracts from one-off contracts. The concept of a single agreement is not new. It is an artificial line to sum-off and default netting practices. Payment of a derivative contract, particularly those of standardised forms, use netting. This minimises credit risk.

==== Recharacterisation ====
In being similar to one another in terms of economic market effects, simple positions are particularly susceptible to being re-characterised. When this happens, substantial legal consequences can result, as each legal instrument has different consequences. Whilst a guarantee and an indemnity have, in substance, the same economic result; the law characterises each differently because it affords an indemnifier less protection than a guarantor. Similarly, a derivative or guarantee must not be recharacterised as an insurance contract, as such contracts are strictly regulated by government regulation. A re-characterisation into an insurance contract would be fatal to the contract, as only licensed parties can issue such terms. The characterisation of financial transactions by the court takes the form of two stages; examining the legal substance, not the form of the agreement. Thus, stating that a contract is a derivative, does not make it a derivative. As held by Lord Millet in Agnew v Commissioners of Inland Revenue (Re Brumark Investments Ltd, characterisation interprets the document and then categorises it within one of the existing legal doctrines. Intention is not relevant, however, there are sensitivities to this matter, primarily concerning the insurance markets. Three key types of recharacterisation can occur to simple positions

1. Guarantees or Indemnities: In Yeoman Credit Ltd v Latter the court held perhaps the most important distinction. The distinction between the two is that a guarantee is a secondary obligation to pay whilst an indemnity is a primary obligation.
2. Guarantees or Performance bonds: Performance bonds are similar to a promissory note, this turns again upon the primacy of the obligations. The courts have been extremely hesitant to implement a performance bond onto parties which are not banks.
3. Guarantees or Insurance: Both are protecting creditors from loss, however a guarantee is narrower. Romer LJ set out three variables to differentiate the two: (1) the motives of the parties differ, insurance is a business contract and cover is provided in consideration for a premium. Guarantees are provided without payment. (2) The manner of dealings differ; an insurer usually deals with the insured and not the reference entity. (3) The means of knowledge which is disclosed. The insured must disclose material facts, why a guarantor is left to himself to determine facts. A guarantee thus is traditionally drafted to stand behind the debtor rather than be payable on the occurrence of an event. In England, prior to the Gambling Act 2005, the courts often interpreted contracts as gambling and avoided them. Any contract which exists under the purview of the Financial Services and Markets Act 2000 is not avoided by the Gambling Act 1845 provisions. This is, in part, due to the Potts Opinion which argued the legal distinctiveness of derivatives from gambling and insurance contracts. This was argued by stating that the payment obligation was not conditional on loss and rights were not dependent on an insurable interest.

=== Funded positions ===
Lending is perhaps the most central aspect of the financial system. As discussed by Benjamin, the law attempts to allocate risk in ways which is acceptable to the parties involved. Bank loans and capital market transactions fall within this category. It may be defined as situations where the risk-taker is the provider of capital to another party. If the risk materialise, the exposure is not merely an obligation to pay, but rather the exposure of the risk-taker is the risk of losing its previously committed capital. That is to say, a funded position is the risk of repayment. When a bank makes a loan, it pays money and runs the risk of a lack of repayment.

==== Difference between funded positions and other positions ====
One might ask what the difference between an asset-backed security and funded positions. The answer is that funded positions are positions which are acquired without backing of other assets.

The true difference is that of funded positions and simple positions. Simple positions, such as guarantees, insurance, standby credits and derivatives. Funded positions differ from simple positions in that simple positions expose risk as a form of a promise. The risk taker agrees to pay the beneficiary upon certain events. This relies upon exposure to credit risk. Funded positions have the risk exposure has the form of a payment, which is to be restored. The risk exists in that it may not be repaid. It is funding a party with the risk being a lack of repayment. This includes the bank and non-bank lending including syndicated loans.

Two overarching forms of funded positions exist between debt and equity, and there are several ways to raise capital. This might be broken down into Bank loans (debt financing) and equity issuing (capital markets). Alternatively, a company may retain profits internally. This may be summarised as:

- Equity shares
- Debt financing
- Retained profits

Few companies can use equity and retained profits entirely. It would not be good business to do so either; debt is a crucial aspect for corporate finance. This relates to the gearing advantages of taking on debt and maximising the value of debt-to-equity to allow equity to gain maximum returns. Debt is repayable in accordance with the terms; whereas equity instruments, typically includes rights of shareholders, rights to receive reports, accounts, pre-emptions (where the company proposes issuing new shares), and the right to vote on strategic decisions affecting the company.

==== Debt financing ====
Bank lending may be categorised according to a large number of variables including the type of borrower, the purpose and the form of the loan facility. Where a bank makes a loan it will typically require a business plan and require security where it has credit concerns. A commitment letter may be produced during the negotiations for a loan. In general these are not legally binding.

A loan facility is an agreement where a bank agrees to lend. It is distinct from the loan itself. Using a loan facility it writes to the bank and the bank makes the loan. LMA syndicated single currency term facility distinguishes between 1. commitment to lend to each lender, 2. average of each; and 3. the loan made under the agreement and the draw down. Three important forms of these are:

- Overdraft facilities
- term loan facilities
- revolving facilities

These may be further categorised into two overarching forms of bank lending, organised based on the term/repayment criteria of the loan. These are:

- on-demand lending (overdraft and other short term) and;
- committed lending (revolving facility or a term loan)

Economist and finance lawyers categories these and further categorise syndication separately but within committed lending. This has been a traditional driver for lending within the debt financing market.

===== On-demand lending =====
Where express terms state that it is repayable one demand, it will be so repayable even if both bank and borrower envisaged that it would be last for some time. This must be an express term. In England & Wales, because of S6 Limitation Act 1980, time for repayment does not start running until the demand is made. This means that the debt, for example an overdraft, is not repayable without demand but will become repayable if requested; even if the parties thought it would not be repayable for some time.

In Sheppard & Cooper Ltd v TSB Bank Plc (No 2) [1996] BCC 965; [1996] 2 ALL ER 654, the plaintiff granted a fixed and floating charge over its assets. He then covenanted to pay or discharge indebtedness on-demand. At any time after indebtedness should become immediately payable, the debtor was authorised to appoint administrative receivers. Soon after a demand was made by the defendant. The plaintiff said that the best that could be done was repayment of half. The defendant appointed administrative receivers to recover the debt as outlined by the charge. The plaintiff sued and claimed claim the time was insufficient. The court held that; "It is physically impossible in most cases for a person to keep the money required to discharge the debt about his person. Must have had reasonable opportunity of implementing reasonable mechanics of payment he may need to employ to discharge the debt." But a "reasonable time" overarching doctrine was found to be too commercially difficult. The courts have held short timelines as being more than sufficient to satisfy the request of on-demand. Walton J only accepted 45 minutes as being a reasonable period of time and in Cripps it was 60 minutes. Therefore the timing of repayment depends on circumstances but is, in commercial matters, extremely quick. If the sum demanded is of an amount which the debtor has, the time must be reasonable to enable the debtor to contact his bank and make necessary arrangements. However, if the party, as in Sheppard admits his inability to pay, Kelly CB believed that seizure was justified immediately stating "If personal service is made and the defendants may have seized immediately afterwards."

Parties will want to avoid insolvency consequences. A bank will normally freeze a customer's account when a winding up petition occurs to avoid dispositions within insolvency. A payment into an overdrawn account is probably a disposition of the company's property in favour of the bank. This is crucial differentiation as the money of an overdrawn account is going directly to a creditor. Payment into an account in credit is not a disposition of the company's property in favour of the bank, however.

The bank makes a payment out of the company's account in accordance with a valid payment instruction - there is no disposition in favour of the bank. As a result, banks traditionally freeze accounts and force insolvent parties to open new accounts.

====== Overdraft ======
An overdraft constitutes a loan, traditionally repayable on demand. It is a running account facility (categorising alongside revolving loans) where its on-demand nature of repayment meant immediately. A bank is only obliged to provide an overdraft if the bank has expressly or impliedly agreed to do so. Legally, where a client overdraws his account, the client is not in breach of contract with the bank; if it did constitute a breach, then the fees charged by the bank would be penalties and correspondingly not allowed. If requesting payment when there is no money in the bank account, the customer is merely requesting an overdraft. This should be noted that this is separate and distinct from credit cards; as credit cards invariably say a client must not go over the credit limit. With overdraft requests, the bank has the option not to comply with the request, although this is rare, as the bankss reputations are built upon a willingness and ability to pay on behalf of clients. Often however, the bank complies and then charges a fee to 'create a loan'.

OFT v Abbey National held that "if a bank does pay, customer has taken to have agreed to accept the bank's standards", which means that they have asked and the bank has provided a loan. Banks may charge interest on an overdraft and may compound that interest The point of an overdraft at law is that it is repayable on demand, however, payment instructions within the agreed overdraft limit must be honoured until notice has been given that the facility (the overdraft) is withdrawn.

===== Committed lending =====
A committed facility is where the bank is committed to lend throughout a certain period.

- Term loan; all at once or in successive tranches. Can be repayable at once (bullet); or according to a payment scheme (amortising)
- Revolving facility; borrow repay and reborrow.
- swingline facility; Which is a committed facility providing for short term advances

Most committed lending facilities will be documented, either by:

- A facility letter or
- A loan agreement

These may be more or less complex, depending on the size of the loan. Oral assurance can give rise to an obligation to lend prior to any documentation being signed. 'A statement made by a bank employee over the telephone that approval' had been given. Most facility letters and loan agreements will contain contractual provisions designed to protect the lender against the credit risk of the borrower. This requires several aspects. Normally it will require conditions precedent, restrictions on the borrower's activities, information covenants, set-off provisions, stipulations for events of default. Lenders will also traditionally take real or personal security. These are designed to protect the lender against:

1. Non Payment of both interest and capital; and
2. Insolvency

These two objectives are achieved by providing for events that make non-payment or insolvency unappealing or transfer the risk associated with said events to third party. This highlights the difference between risk as assessed and actual risk.

====== Material adverse change clauses ======
A common provision relates to material adverse change clauses. The borrow represents/warrants that there has been no material adverse change in its financial condition since the date of the loan agreement. This is a clause which is not often invoked or litigated and therefore the interpretation is uncertain and proof of breach is difficult. Consequences of wrongful invocation by the lender are severe.

Interpretation depends on the terms of the particular clause and is up to lender to prove breach. Cannot be triggered on basis of things lender knew when making the agreement. Normally done by comparing borrower's accounts or other financial information then and now. Other compelling evidence may be enough. Will be material if it significantly affects the borrower's ability to repay the loan in question. We may examine one of the leading authorities on material adverse change clauses in committed lending, Grupo Hotelero Urvasco SA v Carey Value Added [2013] EWHC 1039 (Comm), per Blair J

[334] The use of material adverse change clauses is common in financial documentation in differing contexts, including takeovers and mergers, and loan agreements, as in the present case. In the latter context, they may relieve a lender of its continuing obligations in the event of a significant deterioration in the financial condition of the borrower which threatens its ability to repay but which is short of an insolvency. However, there is little case law, perhaps reflecting the fact that (unlike an insolvency event which is usually clear cut) the interpretation of such provisions may be uncertain, proof of breach difficult, and the consequences of wrongful invocation by the lender severe, both in terms of reputation, and legal liability to the borrower.

[351] In my opinion, an assessment of the financial condition of the company should normally begin with its financial information at the relevant times, and a lender seeking to demonstrate a MAC should show an adverse change over the period in question by reference to that information. The financial condition of a company during the course of an accounting year will usually be capable of being established from interim financial information and/or management accounts.

[352] I agree with the lender however that the enquiry is not necessarily limited to the company's financial information. There may be compelling evidence to show that an adverse change sufficient to satisfy a MAC clause has occurred, even if an analysis limited to the company's financial information might suggest otherwise. [357] [...] Unless the adverse change in its financial condition significantly affects the borrower's ability to perform its obligations, and in particular its ability to repay the loan, it is not a material change. [Similarly, it has been said that:] the lender cannot trigger the clause on the basis of circumstances of which it was aware at the date of the contract since it will be assumed that the parties intended to enter into the agreement in spite of those conditions, although it will be possible to invoke the clause where conditions worsen in a way that makes them materially different in nature" In my view, this states the law correctly. [363] Finally, I should note one construction point which was not in dispute. In order to be material, any change must not merely be temporary.

[364] In summary, authority supports the following conclusions. The interpretation of a "material adverse change" clause depends on the terms of the clause construed according to well established principles. In the present case, the clause is in simple form, the borrower representing that there has been no material adverse change in its financial condition since the date of the loan agreement. Under such terms, the assessment of the financial condition of the borrower should normally begin with its financial information at the relevant times, and a lender seeking to demonstrate a MAC should show an adverse change over the period in question by reference to that information. However the enquiry is not necessarily limited to the financial information if there is other compelling evidence. The adverse change will be material if it significantly affects the borrower's ability to repay the loan in question. However, a lender cannot trigger such a clause on the basis of circumstances of which it was aware at the time of the agreement [...] Finally, it is up to the lender to prove the breach.

Therefore, a change will be material if it significantly affects the borrower's ability to repay the loan in question. Normally this is done by comparing borrower's accounts or other financial information then and now.

=== Net positions ===
A net position represents a financial position in which a debtor may "off-set" his obligation to the creditor with a mutual obligation which has arisen and is owed from the creditor to the debtor. In financial law, this may often take the form of a simple or funded position such as a securities lending transaction where mutual obligations set-off one another. Three crucial types of netting exists:

- Novation Netting
- Settlement Netting
- Transaction Netting

Each party can use its own claim against the other to discharge. Each party bears credit risk which may be offset. For example, a guarantor who is a depositor with a banking institution can set-off obligations he may owe to the bank under the guarantee against the bank's obligation to repay his deposited assets.

=== Asset-backed positions ===
Propriety securities like mortgages, charges, liens, pledges and retention of title clauses are financial positions which are collateralised using proprietary assets to mitigate the risk exposure of the collateral-taker. The core purpose it to Manage credit risk by identifying certain assets and ear-marking claims to those assets.

=== Combined positions ===
Combined positions use multiple facets of the other four positions, assembling them in various combinations to produce large, often complex, transactional structures. Examples of this category are primarily CDOs and other structured products. For example, a synthetic collateralised debt obligation will draw upon derivatives, syndicated lending, and asset-backed positions to distinguish the risk of the reference asset from other risks. The law pertaining to CDOs is particularly noteworthy, primarily for its use of legal concepts such as legal personality, and risk transfer to develop new products. The prevalence and importance of combined positions within the financial markets, has meant that the legal underpinnings of the transactional structures are highly relevant to their enforcement and effectiveness.
