= Roger Swinfen Eady, 3rd Baron Swinfen =

British politician and philanthropist (1938–2022)

The Right Honourable The Lord Swinfen MBE JP
- In Parliament, 2018

Member of the House of Lords
- Lord Temporal
- Hereditary peerage 13 May 1977 – 11 November 1999
- Preceded by: The 2nd Baron Swinfen
- Succeeded by: Seat abolished
- Elected Hereditary Peer; 11 November 1999 – 5 June 2022
- Election: 1999
- Preceded by: Seat established
- Succeeded by: The 6th Baron Wrottesley

Personal details
- Born: 14 December 1938 Knightsbridge, London, England
- Died: 5 June 2022 (aged 83) Canterbury, Kent, England
- Party: Conservative

Roger Mynors Swinfen Eady, 3rd Baron Swinfen, MBE, JP (14 December 1938 – 5 June 2022) was a British politician and philanthropist, who was one of the ninety two hereditary peers elected to remain in the House of Lords following the passing of the House of Lords Act 1999. He sat as a Conservative.

== Early life and education ==
Swinfen was born at his family home at Ovington Square in Knightsbridge, London, England, on 14 December 1938, the elder son of Charles Swinfen Eady, second Baron Swinfen and his novelist wife Mary Wesley. His parents divorced in 1945. He was educated at Westminster School and at the Royal Military Academy, Sandhurst, after which he received a Short Service Commission in The Royal Scots before leaving the British Army in the rank of Lieutenant.

== Later life ==
A philanthropist, he was the Founding Trustee of the Swinfen Charitable Trust and was Director of the American Telemedicine Association from 2009 until 2013.

Swinfen was President of the South East Region British Sports Association for the Disabled and between 1983 and 1997, he served as a Member of the Direct Mail Services Standards Board. In 1988, he became Patron of the Disablement Income Group, in 1996, Patron of Labrador Rescue South East, in 2002, Patron of World Orthopaedic Concern, and of the Kunde Foundation in 2007.

Swinfen was a Liveryman of the Worshipful Company of Drapers as well as a Freeman of the City of London.

== House of Lords ==
Swinfen became the third Baron Swinfen on the death of his father in 1977. As a member of the House of Lords, he was a member on various UK Parliamentary Committees.

== Marriage and children ==
Swinfen married Patricia Anne Blackmore on 24 October 1962. They had four children:

- Hon Georgina Mary Rose Swinfen Eady (born 1 February 1964)
- Hon Katherine Anne Dorothy Swinfen Eady (born 18 May 1966)
- Hon Arabella Victoria Eleanor Swinfen Eady (born 10 March 1969)
- Charles Roger Peregrine Swinfen Eady, 4th Baron Swinfen (born 8 March 1971)

Lady Swinfen died in 2023.

== Death ==
Swinfen died from prostate cancer at a hospice in Canterbury, Kent, on 5 June 2022, at the age of 83. He was succeeded in the barony by his only son, Charles.

== Honours and fellowships ==
- UK Baron (suc. 1977)
- MBE (2016, for "services to international telemedicine and for his work with the Swinfen Charitable Trust")
  - Justice of the Peace (JP) for Kent (1983)
- Fellow, Industry and Parliament Trust (FIPT) (1983)
- Fellow, Royal Institution of Chartered Surveyors (FRICS) (1998)
  - ARICS (1970)
- Hon. Research Fellow, Centre for Online Health (COH), UQ (2001)

== Selected published works ==
- An Evaluation of the First Year's Experience with a Low-cost Telemedicine Link in Bangladesh (2001)
- Store-and-Forward Teleneurology in Developing Countries (2001)
- Experience with a Low-cost Telemedicine System in Three Developing Countries (2001)

== Arms ==
Coat of arms of Roger Swinfen Eady, 3rd Baron Swinfen
Crest A Demi-lion rampant Vert charged on the body with a Battle-axe erect and holding a like Axe in bend Argent Helm That of a Peer Escutcheon Per pale Argent and Vert on a Chevron between three Battle-axes as many Ermine Spots all Counterchanged Supporters Dexter, a Lion guardant Vert charged with a Battle-axe Argent; Sinister, a Lion guardant Argent charged with a Battle-axe Vert Motto Per ardua ad alta (en: Onwards and upwards through hardship) Orders MBE insignia suspended below the Shield

== See also ==
- Baron Swinfen
- Telemedicine

Peerage of the United Kingdom
Preceded by Charles Eady	Baron Swinfen; 1977–2022; Member of the House of Lords (1977–1999)	Succeeded by Charles Eady
Parliament of the United Kingdom
New office created by the House of Lords Act 1999	Elected hereditary peer to the House of Lords under the House of Lords Act 1999; 1999–2022	Succeeded by The Lord Wrottesley
