= Baron Swinfen =

Barony in the Peerage of the United Kingdom

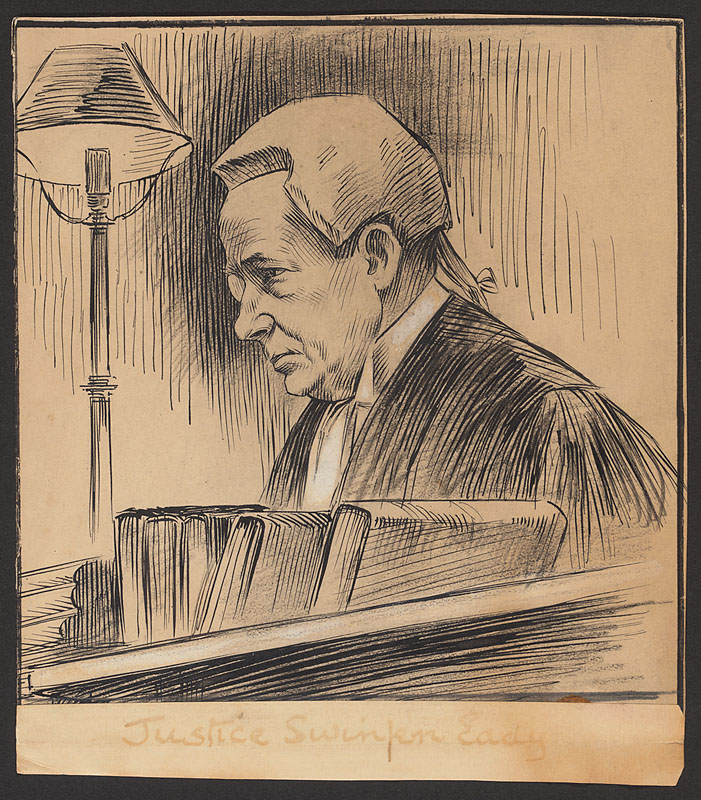
Charles Swinfen Eady, 1st Baron Swinfen

Baron Swinfen, of Chertsey in the County of Surrey, is a title in the Peerage of the United Kingdom. It was created in 1919 for the lawyer and judge Sir Charles Swinfen Eady upon his retirement as Master of the Rolls. He died only two weeks after his elevation to the peerage and was succeeded by his only son, the second Baron. As of 2022 the title is held by the latter's grandson, the fourth Baron, who succeeded in 2022.

The third baron and his wife set up the Swinfen Charitable Trust in 1998, with the aim of assisting poor, sick and disabled people in the developing world. The Trust establishes telemedicine links between hospitals in the developing world and specialists who give free advice by e-mail.

The author Mary Wesley was the first wife of the second Baron Swinfen and the mother of the third Baron.

== Barons Swinfen (1919) ==
- Charles Swinfen Eady, 1st Baron Swinfen (1851–1919)
- Charles Swinfen Eady, 2nd Baron Swinfen (1904–1977)
- Roger Mynors Swinfen Eady, 3rd Baron Swinfen (1938–2022)
- Charles Roger Peregrine Swinfen Eady, 4th Baron Swinfen (b. 1971)

There is no heir to the barony.

== Arms ==
Coat of arms of Baron Swinfen
Crest A demi-lion rampant Vert charged on the body with a battle-axe erect and holding a like axe in bend Argent Escutcheon Per pale Argent and Vert on a chevron between three battle-axes as many Ermine spots all counterchanged. Supporters Dexter a lion guardant Vert charged with a battle-axe Argent, sinister a lion guardant Argent charged with a battle-axe Vert. Motto Per Ardua Ad Alta
