= Peskin v Anderson =

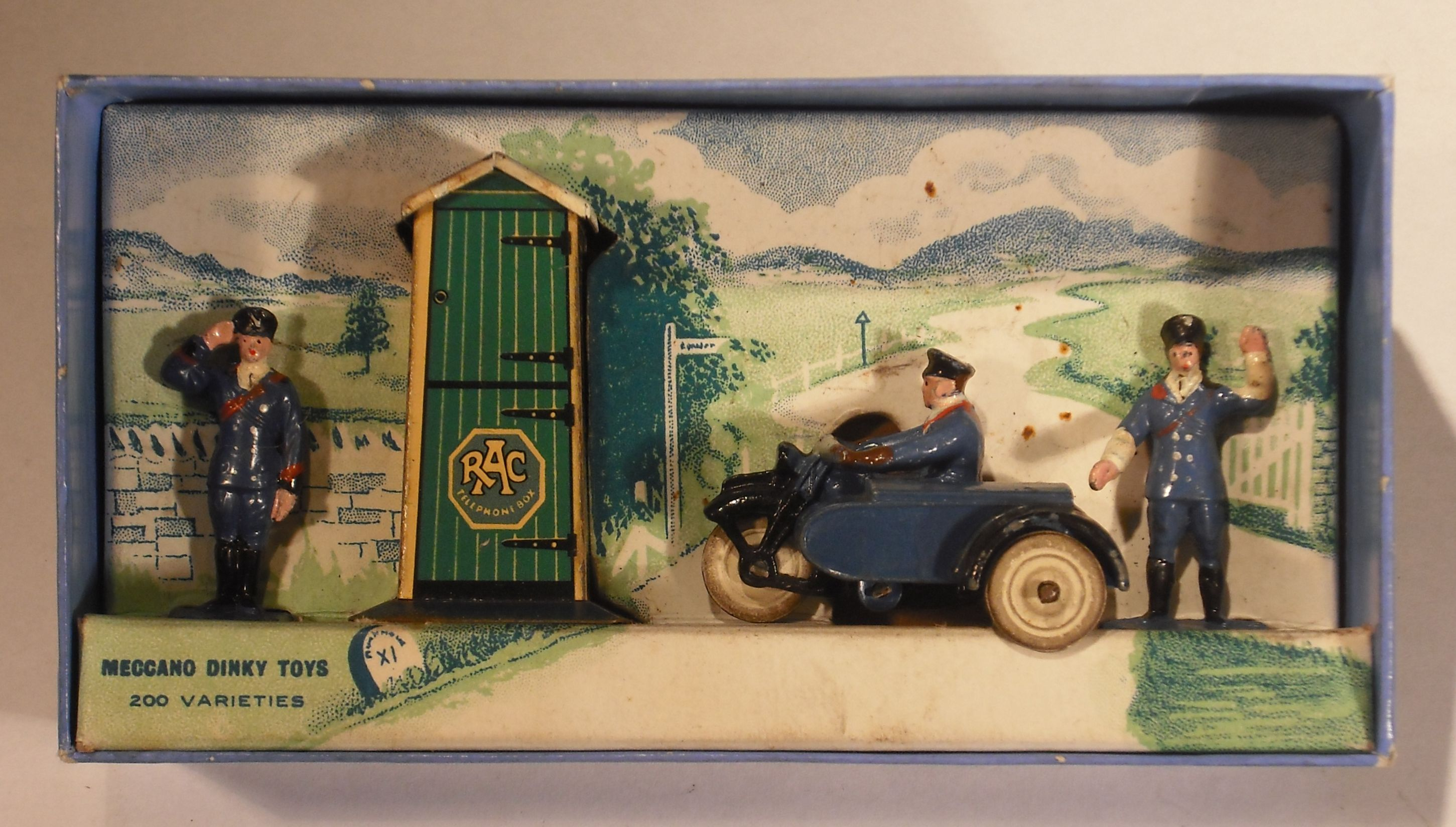
- Court: Court of Appeal of England and Wales
- Full case name: (1) Bruce Peskin (2) Kevin Milner John Anderson & Others
- Decided: 14 December 2000
- Citations: [2000] EWCA Civ 326, [2001] 2 BCLC 1

Court membership
- Judges sitting: Simon Brown LJ; Mummery LJ; Latham LJ

Case opinions
- Mummery LJ

Keywords
- Directors' duties

Peskin v Anderson [2000] EWCA Civ 326 is a UK company law case concerning directors' duties under English law.

== Facts ==
Former members of the Royal Automobile Club (RAC) sued the directors for failing to disclose that they had plans to demutualise. They claimed that they could have received £35,000 had they stayed in the club, but had given up their membership. They claimed that the directors had breached a duty owed to them as shareholders to inform them of the upcoming demutualisation plan.

The RAC applied to have the claims struck out as having no prospect of success as directors did not owe a duty to individual shareholders. The RAC succeeded in having the claims struck out at first instance before Neuberger J, and the claimants appealed to the Court of Appeal.

== Judgment ==
The Court of Appeal dismissed the appeal. The only judgment was given by Mummery LJ.

Although there were several grounds in the appeal, the main proposition for which the judgment is traditionally cited is that directors do not owe a general duty to shareholders, although they may owe a specific duty to a shareholder if there has been an assumption of responsibility. In this case there was no suggestion of such an assumption of responsibility, and so the claims were struck out.

Counsel for the claimants accepted that the fiduciary duties owed by the directors to RAC do not necessarily extend to the individual members, and that, in general, directors do not, solely by virtue of the office of director, owe fiduciary duties to the shareholders, either collectively or individually. The court cited with approval the headnote in Percival v Wright [1902] 2 Ch 421 that:

The directors of a company are not trustees for individual shareholders, and may purchase their shares without disclosing pending negotiations for the sale of the company's undertaking.

In his judgment Mummery LJ noted that the apparently unqualified width of the ruling had, over the course of the previous century, been subjected to increasing judicial, academic and professional critical comment. But that, as a general rule, it was right that directors should not be over-exposed to the risk of multiple legal actions by dissenting minority shareholders.

The existence of fiduciary duties owed by the directors to the company do not however necessarily preclude, in special circumstances, the co-existence of additional duties owed by the directors to individual shareholders. In such cases individual shareholders may bring a direct action (as distinct from a derivative action) against the directors for breach of such duty. The court relied upon Stein v Blake [1998] 1 All ER 724 (at 727D and 729G per Millett LJ) for the principle that a duality of duties may exist. In addition to requiring special circumstances to give rise to such a duty, for a shareholder to have a valid claim breach of such a duty must have caused loss to the shareholder directly (eg. by being induced by a director to part with his shares in the company at an undervalue), as distinct from loss sustained by him by a diminution in the value of his shares (eg. by reason of the misappropriation by a director of the company's assets).

It was affirmed that the fiduciary duties owed to the company arise from the legal relationship between the directors and the company directed and controlled by them. However any fiduciary duties owed to the shareholders do not arise from that legal relationship. They are dependent on establishing a special factual relationship between the directors and the shareholders in any particular case. Events may take place which bring the directors of the company into direct and close contact with the shareholders in a manner capable of generating fiduciary obligations, such as a duty of disclosure of material facts to the shareholders, or an obligation to use confidential information and valuable commercial and financial opportunities, which have been acquired by the directors in that office, for the benefit of the shareholders.

The court referred to examples from other common law jurisdictions where special circumstances had been held to exist which justified the imposition of fiduciary duties on directors to individual shareholders. In the Court of Appeal of New Zealand in Coleman v Myers [1977] 2 NZLR 225 and in the Court of Appeal of New South Wales in Brunninghausen v Glavanics [1999] 46 NSWLR 538 fiduciary duties of directors to shareholders were established in the specially strong context of the familial relationships of the directors and shareholders and their relative personal positions of influence in the company concerned.

But on the facts of the case before them, no such special relationship was claimed, and the actions failed.

== Review ==
The Court of Appeal's decision in Peskin v Anderson has generally been treated as authoritative in relation to the principle to which it relates. It has not been doubted in either subsequent judicial decisions or in academic commentary. In Gower and Davies - Principles of Modern Company Law the editors state: "This principle has now been fully accepted in English law as a result of the recent decision in Peskin v Anderson".

== See also ==
- UK company law
- Percival v Wright [1902] 2 Ch 401
- Meinhard v Salmon
