= Bilateral netting =

Legally enforceable arrangement

Bilateral netting in finance and investments is a legally enforceable arrangement between a bank and a counterparty that creates a single legal obligation covering all included individual contracts. This means that a bank’s obligation, in the event of the default or insolvency of one of the parties, would be the net sum of all positive and negative fair values of contracts included in the bilateral netting arrangement.

== See also ==
- Set-off (law)
