= Percival v Wright =

UK company law case concerning directors' duties

- Court: High Court of Justice
- Citation: [1902] 2 Ch 401

Court membership
- Judge sitting: Swinfen Eady J

Keywords
- company, directors' duties

Percival v Wright [1902] 2 Ch 401 is a UK company law case concerning directors' duties, holding that directors only owe duties of loyalty to the company, and not to individual shareholders. This is now codified in the United Kingdom's Companies Act 2006, section 170.

== Facts ==
Shareholders in Nixon's Navigation Co. wanted to sell their shares, and requested that the company's secretary find purchasers. Some directors of the company purchased the shares at £12.10s per share, which price was based upon independent valuation. After the sale, the shareholders discovered that before and during the negotiations for that sale, the board of directors had been involved in other negotiations to sell the entire company, which would have made those shares substantially more valuable had they come to fruition. The plaintiff sued, claiming breach of fiduciary duty, in that the shareholders should have been told of these negotiations.

== Judgment ==
Swinfen Eady J held the directors owed duties to the company and not shareholders individually.

It was strenuously urged that, though incorporation affected the relations of the shareholders to the external world, the company thereby becoming a distinct entity, the position of the shareholders inter se was not affected, and was the same as that of partners or shareholders in an unincorporated company. I am unable to adopt that view... There is no question of unfair dealing in this case. The directors did not approach the shareholders with the view of obtaining their shares. The shareholders approached the directors, and named the price at which they were desirous of selling. The plaintiffs’ case wholly fails, and must be dismissed with costs.

== Significance ==
Percival v Wright is still considered to be good law, and was followed by the House of Lords in Johnson v Gore Wood & Co [2000] UKHL 65.

However, it has been distinguished in at least two subsequent cases. In Coleman v Myers [1977] 2 NZLR 225 and Peskin v Anderson [2001] BCLC 372 the court described this as being the general rule, but one which may be subject to exceptions where the circumstances are such that a director may owe a greater duty to an individual shareholder, such as when that shareholder is known to be relying upon the director for guidance, or where the shareholder is a vulnerable person.

== See also ==
- UK company law
- Johnson v Gore Wood & Co
