= Charles Swinfen Eady, 1st Baron Swinfen =

British lawyer and judge (1851–1919)

The Right Honourable The Lord Swinfen PC
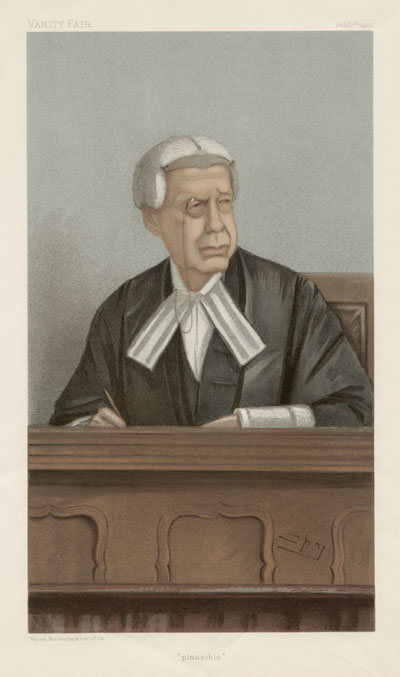

Master of the Rolls
- In office 2 May 1918 – 20 October 1919
- Preceded by: The Lord Cozens-Hardy
- Succeeded by: The Lord Sterndale

Personal details
- Born: Charles Swinfen Eady; 31 July 1851 Chertsey, Surrey
- Died: 15 November 1919 (aged 68) London
- Spouse: Blanche Maude Lee (m. 1894–1919)
- Parents: George John Eady (father); Laura Maria Smith (mother)
- Education: University of London
- Profession: Barrister, judge

Charles Swinfen Eady, 1st Baron Swinfen, PC (31 July 1851 – 15 November 1919) was a British lawyer and judge.

== Biography ==
Eady was the son of George John Eady of Chertsey, Surrey, and his wife Laura Maria Smith, daughter of Richard Smith. He was educated privately and at the University of London, and was admitted a solicitor in 1874.

In 1879 Eady was called to the Bar, Inner Temple. He built a successful legal practice and became a Queen's Counsel in 1893. He was appointed a Judge of the High Court of Justice (Chancery Division) in November 1901, and knighted the following month. He held this office until 1913, when he was appointed a Lord Justice of Appeal, serving until 1918. The latter year he succeeded Lord Cozens-Hardy as Master of the Rolls. However, Eady's health soon began to decline and he resigned in the autumn of 1919. He had been admitted to the Privy Council in 1913 and on 1 November 1919 was raised to the peerage as Baron Swinfen, of Chertsey in the County of Surrey.

Mr Justice Swinfen Eady gave a key judgment in 1903 which protected Kodak's trademarks from infringement from competitors, which the British Journal of Photography described as the most important for photography to have been heard since Talbot v. Laroche in 1854. He also gave the judgment in Percival v Wright [1902] 2 Ch 401, a key decision on directors' duties.

Lord Swinfen married, in 1894, Blanche Maude Lee, daughter of Sydney Williams Lee. They had one son and two daughters.

He died, aged sixty-eight, at 33 Hyde Park Gardens, London, on 15 November 1919, only two weeks after his elevation to the peerage. He was cremated at Golders Green Crematorium. He was succeeded in the barony by his only son Charles, 2nd Baron Swinfen.

== Arms ==
Coat of arms of Charles Swinfen Eady, 1st Baron Swinfen
Crest A demi-lion rampant Vert charged on the body with a battle-axe erect and holding a like axe in bend Argent Escutcheon Per pale Argent and Vert on a chevron between three battle-axes as many Ermine spots all counterchanged. Supporters Dexter a lion guardant Vert charged with a battle-axe Argent, sinister a lion guardant Argent charged with a battle-axe Vert. Motto Per Ardua Ad Alta

Legal offices
Preceded by Sir Herbert Cozens-Hardy	Master of the Rolls; 1918–1919	Succeeded by Lord Sterndale
Peerage of the United Kingdom
New creation	Baron Swinfen; 1919	Succeeded by Charles Swinfen Eady, 2nd Baron Swinfen
