= Re Bank of Credit and Commerce International SA (No 8) =

UK legal case

- Court: House of Lords
- Citations: [1997] UKHL 44, [1998] AC 214, [1997] 3 WLR 909, [1997] 4 All ER 568, [1998] Lloyd's Rep Bank 48, [1997] BCC 965, [1998] 1 BCLC 68

Case opinions
- Lord Hoffmann

Keywords
- Security interest, bank account

Re Bank of Credit and Commerce International SA (No 8) [1998] AC 214 is a UK insolvency law case, concerning the taking of a security interest over a company's assets and priority of creditors in a company winding up.

== Facts ==
BCCI made loans to a number of companies and in its contract purported to take as security, in return for the loans, a charge over the money in the bank accounts these companies held with BCCI. In an earlier case, In re Charge Card Services Ltd Millett J had said it was "conceptually impossible" for a bank to have a charge over assets that were held in an account of its own, on the basis that a bank account is an intangible debt recorded in figures in the bank's own books, and a bank's debt to its customer was not something that the customer could 'own' and charge out. The liquidators of BCCI applied for directions about whether, when they were recovering loans from the main debtor companies they should set off the amounts in credit in the deposit accounts under the Insolvency Rules 1986 rule 4.90.

The High Court held that since the security agreements did not impose personal liability on the third parties for the loans, the companies had no right to set-off under rule 4.90. In the Court of Appeal Millet LJ gave the leading judgment and said ‘a man cannot have a proprietary interest in a debt or other obligation which he owes another.’ The charges were conceptually impossible. Yet they were nevertheless good security by reason of the contractual provision limiting the right to repayment and that there were no grounds for holding that they were ineffective unless construed as imposing personal liability.

== Judgment ==
Lord Hoffmann held that the charges were valid and not conceptually impossible. He referred to the general attributes of charges and went on. He said the right to claim payment of a deposit with a bank is a chose in action - a proprietary right. It can be granted to a third party. So a charge could be created over a deposit in favour of BCCI. He said as follows.

The doctrine of conceptual impossibility was first propounded by Millett J. in In re Charge Card Services Ltd [1987] Ch 150, 175-176 and affirmed, after more extensive discussion, by the Court of Appeal in this case. It has excited a good deal of heat and controversy in banking circles; the Legal Risk Review Committee, set up in 1991 by the Bank of England to identify areas of obscurity and uncertainty in the law affecting financial markets and propose solutions, said that a very large number of submissions from interested parties expressed disquiet about this ruling. It seems clear that documents purporting to create such charges have been used by banks for many years. The point does not previously appear to have been expressly addressed by any court in this country. Supporters of the doctrine rely on the judgments of Buckley L.J. (in the Court of Appeal) and Viscount Dilhorne and Lord Cross of Chelsea (in the House of Lords) in Halesowen Presswork & Assemblies Ltd v Westminster Bank Ltd [1971] 1 QB 1; [1972] A.C. 785 . The passages in question certainly say that it is a misuse of language to speak of a bank having a lien over its own indebtedness to a customer. But I think that these observations were directed to the use of the word lien," which is a right to retain possession, rather than to the question of whether the bank could have any kind of proprietary interest. Opponents of the doctrine rely upon some 19th-century cases, of which it can at least be said that the possibility of a charge over a debt owed by the chargee caused no judicial surprise.

The reason given by the Court of Appeal [1996] Ch. 245, 258 was that "a man cannot have a proprietary interest in a debt or other obligation which he owes another." In order to test this proposition, I think one needs to identify the normal characteristics of an equitable charge and then ask to what extent they would be inconsistent with a situation in which the property charged consisted of a debt owed by the beneficiary of the charge. There are several well-known descriptions of an equitable charge (see, for example, that of Atkin LJ in National Provincial and Union Bank of England v Charnley [1924] 1 KB 431, 449-450) but none of them purports to be exhaustive. Nor do I intend to provide one. An equitable charge is a species of charge, which is a proprietary interest granted by way of security. Proprietary interests confer rights in rem which, subject to questions of registration and the equitable doctrine of purchaser for value without notice, will be binding upon third parties and unaffected by the insolvency of the owner of the property charged. A proprietary interest provided by way of security entitles the holder to resort to the property only for the purpose of satisfying some liability due to him (whether from the person providing the security or a third party) and, whatever the form of the transaction, the owner of the property retains an equity of redemption to have the property restored to him when the liability has been discharged. The method by which the holder of the security will resort to the property will ordinarily involve its sale or, more rarely, the extinction of the equity of redemption by foreclosure. A charge is a security interest created without any transfer of title or possession to the beneficiary. An equitable charge can be created by an informal transaction for value (legal charges may require a deed or registration or both) and over any kind of property (equitable as well as legal) but is subject to the doctrine of purchaser for value without notice applicable to all equitable interests.

The depositor's right to claim payment of his deposit is a chose in action which the law has always recognised as property. There is no dispute that a charge over such a chose in action can validly be granted to a third party. In which respects would the fact that the beneficiary of the charge was the debtor himself be inconsistent with the transaction having some or all of the various features which I have enumerated? The method by which the property would be realised would differ slightly: instead of the beneficiary of the charge having to claim payment from the debtor, the realisation would take the form of a book entry. In no other respect, as it seems to me, would the transaction have any consequences different from those which would attach to a charge given to a third party. It would be a proprietary interest in the sense that, subject to questions of registration and purchaser for value without notice, it would be binding upon assignees and a liquidator or trustee in bankruptcy. The depositor would retain an equity of redemption and all the rights which that implies. There would be no merger of interests because the depositor would retain title to the deposit subject only to the bank's charge. The creation of the charge would be consensual and not require any formal assignment or vesting of title in the bank. If all these features can exist despite the fact that the beneficiary of the charge is the debtor, I cannot see why it cannot properly be said that the debtor has a proprietary interest by way of charge over the debt.

The Court of Appeal said that the bank could obtain effective security in other ways. If the deposit was made by the principal debtor, it could rely upon contractual rights of set-off or combining accounts or rules of bankruptcy set-off under provisions such as rule 4.90. If the deposit was made by a third party, it could enter into contractual arrangements such as the limitation on the right to withdraw the deposit in this case, thereby making the deposit a "flawed asset." All this is true. It may well be that the security provided in these ways will in most cases be just as good as that provided by a proprietary interest. But that seems to me no reason for preventing banks and their customers from creating charges over deposits if, for reasons of their own, they want to do so. The submissions to the Legal Risk Review Committee made it clear that they do.

If such charges are granted by companies over their "book debts" they will be registrable under section 395 and 396(1)(e) of the Companies Act 1985. There is a suggestion in the judgment of the Court of Appeal that the banking community has been insufficiently grateful for being spared the necessity of registering such charges. In my view, this is a matter on which banks are entitled to make up their own minds and take their own advice on whether the deposit charged is a "book debt" or not. I express no view on the point, but the judgment of my noble and learned friend, Lord Hutton, in Northern Bank Ltd v Ross [1990] BCC 883 suggests that, in the case of deposits with banks, an obligation to register is unlikely to arise.

Since the decision in In re Charge Card Services Ltd [1987] Ch 150 statutes have been passed in several offshore banking jurisdictions to reverse its effect. A typical example is section 15A of the Hong Kong Law Amendment and Reform (Consolidation) Ordinance (c. 23), which I have already mentioned. It reads:

"For the avoidance of doubt, it is hereby declared that a person ('the first person') is able to create, and always has been able to create, in favour of another person ('the second person') a legal or equitable charge or mortgage over all or any of the first person's interest in a chose in action enforceable by the first person against the second person, and any charge or mortgage so created shall operate neither to merge the interest thereby created with, nor to extinguish or release, that chose in action."

There is similar legislation in Singapore (section 9A of the Civil Law Act (c. 43)); Bermuda (the Charge and Security (Special Provisions) Act 1990 (c. 53)) and the Cayman Islands (the Property (Miscellaneous Provisions) Law 1994 (No. 7 of 1994)). The striking feature about all these provisions is that none of them amend or repeal any rule of common law which would be inconsistent with the existence of a charge over a debt owed by the chargee. They simply say that such a charge can be granted. If the trick can be done as easily as this, it is hard to see where the conceptual impossibility is to be found.

In a case in which there is no threat to the consistency of the law or objection of public policy, I think that the courts should be very slow to declare a practice of the commercial community to be conceptually impossible. Rules of law must obviously be consistent and not self-contradictory; thus in Rye v Rye [1962] AC 496, 505, Viscount Simonds demonstrated that the notion of a person granting a lease to himself was inconsistent with every feature of a lease, both as a contract and as an estate in land. But the law is fashioned to suit the practicalities of life and legal concepts like "proprietary interest" and "charge" are no more than labels given to clusters of related and self-consistent rules of law. Such concepts do not have a life of their own from which the rules are inexorably derived. It follows that in my view the letter was effective to do what it purported to do, namely to create a charge over the deposit in favour of B.C.C.I.

== See also ==
- UK insolvency law
