= Stein v Blake =

- Court: House of Lords
- Decided: 18 May 1995
- Citations: [1995] UKHL 11 [1996] 1 AC 243 [1995] 2 All ER 961
- Transcript: BAILII

Case history
- Appealed from: [1994] Ch 16
- Subsequent action: [2001] All ER (D) 94

Court membership
- Judges sitting: Lord Keith of Kinkel; Lord Ackner; Lord Lloyd of Berwick; Lord Nicholls of Birkenhead; Lord Hoffmann

Case opinions
- Decision by: Lord Hoffmann

Keywords
- set-off, insolvency, contingent claims

Stein v Blake [1995] UKHL 11 is a decision of the House of Lords in relation to the effect of automatic set-off in bankruptcy, and the power of a bankruptcy trustee to assign rights in action after the operation of such set-off under English law.

== Issues ==
The only judgment was given by Lord Hoffman. He commenced his speech by summarising the issues as follows:

If A and B have mutual claims against each other and A becomes bankrupt, does A's claim against B continue to exist so that A's trustee can assign it to a third party? Or is the effect of section 323 of the Insolvency Act 1986 to extinguish the claims of A and B and to substitute a claim for the net balance owing after setting off the one against the other? And if the latter is the case, can the trustee assign the net balance (if any) before it has been ascertained by the taking of an account between himself and B? If yes, is that what the trustee in this case has done? These are the issues in this appeal.

Section 323 provides as follows:

(1) This section applies where before the commencement of the bankruptcy there have been mutual credits, mutual debts or other mutual dealings between the bankruptcy and any creditor of the bankrupt proving or claiming to prove for a bankruptcy debt.

(2) An account shall be taken of what is due from each party to the other in respect of the mutual dealings and the sums due from one party shall be set off against the sums due from the other.

(3) Sums due from the bankrupt to another party shall not be included in the account taken under subsection (2) if that other party had notice at the time they became due that a bankruptcy petition relating to the bankrupt was pending.

(4) Only the balance (if any) of the account taken under subsection (2) is provable as a bankruptcy debt or, as the case may be, to be paid to the trustee as part of the bankrupt’s estate.

== Facts ==
Mr Stein was declared bankrupt by court order on 16 July 1990. At that time he was the recipient of legal aid, and was in litigation with Mr Blake. Mr Stein was suing for breach of contract, and Mr Blake had various counterclaims, including claims under costs orders which Lord Hoffman described "indisputable". Mr Stein's trustee in bankruptcy executed a deed of assignment on 4 April 1991 under which he assigned the benefit of those claims back to Mr Stein in return for 49% of the net proceeds. Mr Stein once again obtained legal aid in relation to those claims, and Mr Blake brought this action to have the proceedings dismissed on the ground that the effect of the statutory set-off under section 323 meant that the claims could not validly be assigned.

In the Court of Appeal, where Millett LJ had given the lead judgment, it had been held that the operation of insolvency set-off was procedural. Accordingly, because the assignment had taken place before an account had been taken, the full amount of the claim had been assigned without any deduction for set-off. Mr Blake appealed against this decision.

== Decision ==
Lord Hoffman gave a long and careful exposition of the law relating to both procedural and insolvency set-off as it had developed from the time of Queen Anne. He noted that whilst procedural set-off required the claims to be a definite amount at the time the claims merged into a cause of action by way of issuing legal proceedings, insolvency set-off was not so limited. It was possible to set-off claims which were unliquidated, future or subject to contingencies under the insolvency set-off regime.

He further held that the operation of the set-off was automatic, and did not require any action on the part of the parties, following National Westminster Bank Ltd v Halesowen Presswork & Assemblies Ltd [1972] AC 785 on this point. The operation of the insolvency set-off rules was to extinguish the balance of any debt automatically.

He endorsed the view expressed by Neill J in Farley v Housing & Commercial Developments Ltd [1984] BCLC 442 that after the operation of the set-off the claim for any balance did survive, and further, that as this was an asset of the bankrupt's estate, it was an asset which could be assigned by the trustee.

Lord Hoffman also clarified that the effective date of the set-off was the date upon which the bankruptcy commenced. Accordingly, where the debt of the bankrupt is a contingent debt, then the debt must be valued at that date for the set-off to be given effect. In this respect the House of Lords followed the earlier Australian High Court decision in Gye v McIntyre (1991) 171 CLR 609.

In relation to the proper construction of the terms of the deed of assignment, Lord Hoffman held that this did indeed assign the net balance of the claim to Mr Stein.

He noted that counsel for Mr Blake had made an appeal to policy that it was unfair that defendants should suffer potential claims by litigants who were bankrupt and supported by legal aid (against whom they could not recover their costs), but he expressed the view that this was a matter for Parliament, and not something which should affect the determination of the issue in the appeal.
