= ISDA Master Agreement =

Master service agreement for OTC derivatives transactions

The ISDA Master Agreement, published by the International Swaps and Derivatives Association (ISDA), is the most commonly used master service agreement for over-the-counter (OTC) derivatives transactions internationally. It is part of a framework of documents, designed to enable OTC derivatives to be documented fully and flexibly. The framework consists of a master agreement, a schedule, confirmations, definition booklets, and credit support documentation.

The master agreement is a document agreed to between two parties that sets out standard terms that apply to all the transactions entered into between those parties. Each time that a transaction is entered into, the terms of the master agreement apply automatically and do not need to be re-negotiated.

Although it is often viewed as a tool for banks and financial institutions, the Master Agreement is widely used by a wide variety of counterparties.

== Advantages ==
The master agreement is quite lengthy, and the negotiation process can be burdensome, but once a master agreement is signed, the documentation of future transactions between parties is reduced to a brief confirmation of the material terms of the transaction.

The master agreement also aids in reducing disputes by providing extensive resources defining its terms and explaining the intent of the contract, thereby preventing disputes from beginning as well as providing a neutral resource to interpret standard contractual terms. Finally, the master agreement greatly aids in risk and credit management for the parties.

== History ==
The ISDA Master Agreement is a development of the Swaps Code, introduced by ISDA in 1985 and updated in 1986. In its earliest form, it consisted of standard definitions, representations and warranties, events of default, and remedies.

In 1987, ISDA produced three documents: (i) a standard form master agreement for U.S. dollar interest-rate swaps; (ii) a standard form master agreement for multi-currency interest-rate and currency swaps (collectively known as the "1987 ISDA Master Agreement"); and (iii) the interest rate and currency definitions.

The 1990s resulted in major document production by ISDA, including (i) a revised version of the Swaps Code, known as the 1991 ISDA Definitions, drafted and replaced later by the 2000 ISDA Definitions; (ii) a revision to the 1987 Master Agreement resulting in the 1992 Master Agreement; (iii) the User's Guide to the 1992 Master Agreement, drafted in 1993, explaining in detail each section of the 1992 Master Agreement; (iv) the Commodities Derivatives Definitions, drafted in 1993 and supplemented in 2000; and (v) the Annex, providing for collateral documentation, finalised in 1994, followed by its User's Guide in 1995.

The Master Agreement was updated again in 2002 (known as the 2002 ISDA Master Agreement). The move to update the 1992 Agreement had its origins in the succession of crises that affected the global financial markets in the late 1990s. These events, including the liquidation of Hong Kong broker-dealer Peregrine Investments Holdings and the 1998 Russian financial crisis, tested the ISDA documentation to a previously unseen degree. Although the ISDA documentation withstood that test, ISDA decided to establish a strategic review of its documentation to see what lessons could be learned from these events. This review led, in time, to the full-scale update of 1992 Agreement, which culminated in the 2002 Agreement.

== Document architecture ==
The master agreement is the central document around which the rest of the ISDA documentation structure is built. The preprinted master agreement is never altered except to insert the names of the parties, but is customised through use of the schedule to the master agreement, a document containing elections, additions and amendments to the master agreement.

Together with the schedule, the master agreement sets forth all of the general terms and conditions necessary to properly allocate the risks of the transactions between the parties but does not contain any commercial terms specific to a particular transaction. Once the master agreement is executed, the parties can enter into numerous transactions by agreeing to the material commercial terms over the telephone as evidenced by a written confirmation without any need to revisit the underlying terms contained in the master agreement.

There are two versions of the Master Agreement, the local version for transactions between parties located in the same jurisdiction who are transacting in only one currency, and the multicurrency version for use when parties are located in different jurisdictions transacting in different currencies. The provisions included in the multicurrency version but not in the local currency version concern issues such as taxes, currency of payment, the use of multiple offices to enter into transactions, and the designation of an agent for service of process. (Note: Despite this distinction, the multicurrency version is often used even when transactions are in the same jurisdiction and payment will be in the same currency in order to include the more comprehensive provisions contained in the multicurrency version.)

=== Single agreement ===
Section 1(c) of the 2002 ISDA Master Agreement states that:

All transactions are entered into in reliance on the fact that this Master Agreement and all Confirmations form a single agreement between the parties ... and the parties would not otherwise enter into any Transactions.

This single agreement concept is integral to the structure and forms part of the netting based protection offered by the master agreement. The fact that all transactions are the one contract reinforces the ability to close out those transactions and come up with a single net amount payable if a default occurs.

=== Events of default and termination events ===
Section 5 of the ISDA Master Agreement contains the "Events of Default" and the "Termination Events". These are events which can lead to termination of transactions before their intended maturity.

The Events of Default can be described in summary as events for which a party is at fault, such as a failure to perform under a transaction, breach of a representation or undertaking, and insolvency.

The Termination Events are other events which, although no-one is at fault, warrant the early termination of the transactions, such as a change in tax law resulting in taxes being imposed on transactions, illegality, and a merger of a party resulting in a deterioration in its credit quality. Parties may also elect to specify Additional Termination Events in the Schedule, such as a decline in a corporate party's credit rating or a decline in a hedge fund's Net asset value.

=== Close out and netting ===
Section 6 of the ISDA Master Agreement contains the provisions which enable a party to terminate transactions early if an Event of Default or Termination Event occurs in respect of the other party and set out the procedure to calculate and net the termination values of those transactions to produce a single amount payable between the parties.

There are two elections that the parties make in the Schedule which affect the operation of these provisions:

- whether the party not at fault is required to pay if the net termination amount is worked out to be payable to the party at fault. This is a choice of payment method between "First Method" (under which the party not at fault does not need to pay) and "Second Method" (under which the party not at fault is required to pay);
- whether the termination values for the transaction will be determined by obtaining quotes from dealers in the market for replacement transactions or by the party not at fault working out how much it has lost or gained as a result of early termination. This is a choice of payment measure between "Market Quotation" and "Loss".

The above only applies in relation to the 1992 Master Agreement. The 2002 Master Agreement did away with First and Second method. In practice First Method was very rarely opted for because its use required the relevant financial institutions to report their gross, rather than net, exposure under the Master Agreement. The 2002 Master Agreement also replaced the distinction between Market Quotation and Loss with a single concept, "Close-out Amount". This is determined in respect of each Terminated Transaction and is, broadly, the profit or loss which would be made in incurred on entering into an equivalent Transaction as of the Early Termination Date. The aggregate of the Close-out Amounts and Unpaid Amounts is referred to as the "Early Termination Amount". This is the net amount payable by one party to the other in respect of the Terminated Transactions.

=== Taxation ===
Section 2(d) of the ISDA Master Agreement contains provisions setting out the consequences if a tax is imposed on a payment required to be made by a party under a transaction. Included is a gross-up obligation for certain "Indemnifiable Taxes". This interlocks with other provisions in the ISDA Master Agreement, such as the taxation representations contained in ss 3(e) and 3(f), undertakings in ss 4(a) and 4(d), and termination events in ss 5(b)(ii) and 5(b)(iii). These provisions are extremely complex and great care is usually taken by negotiators to ensure that the result is not the opposite of what was intended.

The range of taxation matters which can be relevant to particular derivative transactions include interest withholding tax, quasi-withholding tax, goods and services tax and stamp duty.

=== Multi-branch issues ===
Section 10 of the ISDA Master Agreement addresses issues that arise in connection with counterparties that enter into transactions through more than one office or branch and more than one jurisdiction.

== Related documents ==
=== Schedule ===
The Schedule and Paragraph 13 are used to make all amendments to and customisations of the Master Agreement and Annex, including the elections of the various options presented to the parties in the Master Agreement and Annex and the addition of provisions not contained in the Master Agreement. It contains:

- the elections referred to in the Master Agreement, such as the payment measures and methods, the thresholds relating to certain events of default, and the offices through which parties can act;
- any amendments that the parties agree to make to the terms of the Master Agreement; and
- any additional terms that the parties want to include, such as a set-off clause between close-out amounts and amounts owing under other contracts.

The printed form of the Master Agreement is never amended on the face of the document. In negotiations it is not even exchanged, on the presumption that the standard terms will always be used.

=== Credit support documentation ===
There are various standard forms of credit support documentation prepared by ISDA. The key distinctions between each include their governing law (English, New York and Japanese) and method of transfer of collateral (title transfer and security interest).

The main credit support documents governed by English law are the 1995 Credit Support Annex, the 1995 Credit Support Deed and the 2016 Credit Support Annex for Variation Margin. The English law Credit Support Annexes provide for title transfer collateral, whereas the English law Credit Support Deed provides for a security interest to be granted over transferred collateral. The 2016 Credit Support Annex for Variation Margin has been specifically introduced to allow parties to comply with their obligations to exchange Variation Margin in accordance with margin regimes around the world, including EMIR in Europe and Dodd-Frank in the United States of America. The English law Credit Support Annexes are Confirmations, and the transactions constituted by them are Transactions, under the Master Agreement and therefore form part of the single agreement together with the Master Agreement. The English law Credit Support Deed, on the other hand, is a separate agreement between the parties.

The use of one or more credit support documents is optional but is common in Master Agreements for OTC derivative transactions. Credit support documentation is added where parties wish to provide for the exchange of collateral if the exposure (under the derivative transactions covered by the credit support document) of one party to the other exceeds an agreed amount. The credit support documentation contains provisions concerning the posting and return of collateral, the types of collateral that may be used, and the treatment of collateral by the recipient.

=== Confirmations ===
Derivatives transactions are usually entered into orally or electronically and the contract between the parties is formed at this time. The evidence of the terms of the transaction is contained in a confirmation (also known as a trading advice or contract note), usually a short letter, fax or email. The form of the confirmation is set out in the Master Agreement and a limited period of time is usually allowed for objections or amendments to the confirmation after its receipt. Confirmations are usually very short (except for complex transactions) and contain little more than dates, amounts, and rates. Confirmations are exchanged to minimise the possibility of a dispute as to the terms of a transaction occurring.

=== Definitions ===
ISDA has produced a wide array of supporting materials for the Master Agreement, including definitions and user's guides. This documentation is designed to prevent disputes and to facilitate the consistent use and interpretation of the Master Agreement. These materials are produced by ISDA and are regularly updated to reflect the most recent regulatory or market changes.

Each type of derivative transaction, such as credit derivative, currency derivatives, and equity derivatives have their own definitional booklet.

== Legal issues ==
=== Netting ===
The Master Agreement allows parties to calculate their financial exposure under OTC transactions on a net basis, i.e. a party calculates the difference between what it owes to a counterparty under a Master Agreement and what the counterparty owes it under the same agreement.

These calculations are made on a mark-to-market basis to reflect the current position of each transaction.

The Master Agreement permits the netting of payments due under the same transaction so that only a single amount is exchanged between the parties, rather than numerous payments involving the same transactions. Most counterparties also agree to net all amounts due on a single day regardless of whether amounts are due under a single or multiple transactions.

=== Set-off ===
Set-off is used as a final settlement of accounts that extinguishes the mutual debts owed between the parties in exchange for a new, net amount due. The parties are incentivized to pay in a timely manner by the imposition of interest on any amounts paid after the due date.

In support of this practice, the United States Bankruptcy Code exempts participants in OTC derivative transactions from the automatic stay provisions of the Bankruptcy Code and permits them to set-off obligations owed between the creditor and the bankrupt party even during the pendency of a bankruptcy stay order.

=== Authority and capacity ===
The principles for resolving the issue as to whether an individual has the authority to bind the company are not special to derivatives, they are derived from traditional agency law. In essence it is necessary to examine the relevant circumstances to determine whether the individual had the actual or apparent authority to bind the company to the transaction. It is common for parties to exchange authorised signatory lists of persons who have authority to execute confirmations and refer to this in the Schedule to the ISDA Master Agreement. However, this does not mean that this is determinative of the authority issue, and a person not on one of these lists may have the authority to sign a confirmation. As a matter of market practice, this issue is dealt with on the understanding that institutions are responsible for their own internal authorisation matters and that any person who is held out as being able to enter into OTC derivative transactions has the apparent authority to do so.

=== Reliance and suitability ===
One area in which a party to an OTC transaction can be attacked by its counterparty, if the transactions "goes south", is if the counterparty was relying on the party in relation to the transaction and the party owes either some kind of fiduciary relationship to the counterparty or has engaged in misleading conduct in inducing the counterparty to enter into the trade. In this regard the principles of equity, contract, and trade practices law apply to OTC derivatives in the same way as they apply to other contracts.

Parties try to limit this responsibility by including "non-reliance" representations in their agreements, to the effect that each is not relying on the other and they are making their own independent decisions. Whilst these representations are useful, they would not prevent an action under trade practices legislation nor other actions if the conduct of a party was inconsistent with this representation.

=== Termination ===
While set-off provisions provides a creditor some relief from a counterparty's bankruptcy by permitting the set-off of obligations due and owing, it does not provide relief from the exposure to future positions that have not yet become due and owing. In recognition of this problem, the Master Agreement contains provisions permitting a creditor party to terminate and liquidate transactions upon a counterparty's bankruptcy or other default under the Master Agreement (acceleration).

The Master Agreement provides the parties two means by which the Master Agreement and all transactions thereunder may be terminated upon the occurrence of specified events. The first is the occurrence of an event of default, which permits a party to terminate the Master Agreement and liquidate all transactions if the other party is affected by an Event of Default. In contrast, Termination Events may affect both parties, are usually the result of the actions of third parties, and may provide the affected party a grace period to cure the Termination Event before the other party may terminate and liquidate the Master Agreement.

== In popular culture ==
In the movie The Big Short, which is based on Michael Lewis' book by the same name, an ISDA Master Agreement is referred to as a "hunting license", reserved only for the "big boys" (i.e. institutional investors). Originally devised with the banks and other institutional players in mind, the doors were opened to ultra-high net worth individuals. The maximum licenses at any point peaked at 3000.
