= Paul "The Plumber" Davidson =

British businessman and entrepreneur (born 1955)

Paul "The Plumber" Davidson (born 21 June 1955) is a British businessman and entrepreneur. He became widely known in the UK business press following proceedings brought by the Financial Services Authority (FSA) concerning a spread bet related to the 2002 flotation of biotechnology company Cyprotex. In 2006, the Financial Services and Markets Tribunal determined the references in favour of Davidson and trader Ashley Tatham.

A former pipe-fitter, from which his nickname derives, Davidson was fined £750,000 by the Financial Services Authority for market abuse in 2004, a fine which was subsequently overturned.

== Early life ==
Davidson was born in Edgware in north London and later moved to Cheshire as a teenager, leaving school at 15 and taking an apprenticeship with Shell as a pipe-fitting apprentice.

== Cyprotex spread bet and market abuse proceedings ==
In October 2003, the FSA issued a decision notice stating that it had decided to impose a financial penalty of £750,000 on Davidson in connection with an alleged scheme or arrangement to facilitate the flotation of Cyprotex, involving a spread bet placed with City Index and associated hedging transactions. The matter was referred to the Financial Services and Markets Tribunal, which heard evidence in early 2006.

The Tribunal determined the references in favour of Davidson and Tatham and concluded that there was no regulatory obligation to disclose the spread bet or related contract for differences in the prospectus or elsewhere, and that the non-disclosure was not market abuse within the meaning of the Financial Services and Markets Act 2000.
