= Set-off (law) =

Legal process replacing gross debts with net debts

In law, set-off or netting is a legal technique applied between persons or businesses with mutual rights and liabilities, replacing gross positions with net positions. It permits the rights to be used to discharge the liabilities where cross claims exist between a plaintiff and a respondent, the result being that the gross claims of mutual debt produce a single net claim. The net claim is known as a net position. In other words, a set-off is the right of a debtor to balance mutual debts with a creditor.

Any balance remaining due either of the parties is still owed, but the mutual debts have been set off. The power of net positions lies in reducing credit exposure, and also offers regulatory capital requirement and settlement advantages, which contribute to market stability.

== Difference between set-off and netting ==
Whilst netting and set-off are often used interchangeably, a legal distinction is made between netting, which describes the procedure for and outcome of implementing a set-off. By contrast set-off describes the legal bases for producing net positions. Netting describes the form such as novation netting or close-out netting, whilst set-off describes judicially-recognised grounds such as independent set-off or insolvency set-off. Therefore, netting or setting off gross positions involves the use of offsetting positions with the same counter-party to address counter-party credit risk.

=== Mutuality ===
The law does not permit counter-parties to use third party debt to set off against an un-related liability. All forms of set-off require mutuality between claim and cross claim. This protects property rights both inside insolvency and out, primarily by ensuring that a non-owner cannot benefit from insolvency.

== Market effect ==
The primary objective of netting is to reduce systemic risk by lowering the number of claims and cross claims which may arise from multiple transactions between the same parties. This prevents credit risk exposure, and prevents liquidators or other insolvency officers from cherry-picking transactions which may be profitable for the insolvent company.

== Netting ==
At least three principal forms of netting may be distinguished in the financial markets. Each is heavily relied upon to manage financial market, specifically credit, risk

Since claims are a major form of property nowadays and since creditors are often also debtors to the same counterparty, the law of set off is of paramount importance in international affairs

— P. Wood, Title Finance, Derivatives, Securitisation, Set off and Netting, (London: Sweet & Maxwell, 1995), 72

=== Novation netting ===
Also called rolling netting, netting by novation involves amending contracts by the agreement of the parties. This extinguishes the previous claims and replaces them with new claims.

Suppose that on Monday, 'A' and 'B' enter into transaction 1, whereby A agrees to pay B £1,000,000 on Thursday. On Tuesday A and B enter into transaction 2, whereby B agrees to pay A £400,000 on Thursday. Novation netting takes effect on Tuesday to extinguish the obligations of the parties under both transaction 1 and 2, and to create in their place a new obligation on A to pay to B £600,000 on Thursday.

— Benjamin, Joanna, Financial Law (2007, Oxford University Press), 267

This differs from settlement netting (outlined below) because the fusion of both claims into one, producing a single balance, occurs immediately at the conclusion of each subsequent contract. This method of netting is crucial in financial settings, particularly derivatives transactions, as it avoids cherry-picking in insolvency. The effectiveness of pre-insolvency novation netting in an insolvency was discussed in British Eagle International Airlines Ltd v Compagnie Nationale Air France [1975] 1 WLR 758. Similar to settlement netting, novation netting is only possible if the obligations have the same settlement date. This means that if, in the above example, transaction-2 was to be paid on Friday, the two transactions would not offset.

=== Close out netting ===
An effective close-out netting scheme is said to be crucial for an efficient financial market. Close out netting differs from novation netting in that it extends to all outstanding obligations of the party under a master agreement similar to the one used by ISDA. These traditionally only operate upon an event of default or insolvency. In the event of counterparty bankruptcy or any other relevant event of default specified in the relevant agreement if accelerated (i.e. effected), all transactions or all of a given type are netted (i.e. set off against each other) at market value or, if otherwise specified in the contract or if it is not possible to obtain a market value, at an amount equal to the loss suffered by the non-defaulting party in replacing the relevant contract. The alternative would allow the liquidator to choose which contracts to enforce and which not to (and thus potentially "cherry pick"). There are international jurisdictions where the enforceability of netting in bankruptcy has not been legally tested. The key elements of close out netting are:

- default
- the accretion of the time for performance of obligations to the time of default
- conversion of non-cash obligations into debts; meaning obligations to deliver non-cash assets are converted to market price equivalents; and
- set off

Similar methods of close out netting exist to provide standardised agreements in market trading relating to derivatives and security lending such asrepos, forwards or options. The effect is that the netting avoids valuation of future and contingent debt by an insolvency officer and prevents insolvency officers from disclaiming executory contract obligations, as is allowed within certain jurisdictions such as the US and UK. The mitigated systemic risk which is induced by a close out scheme is protected legislatively. Other systemic challenges to netting, such as regulatory capital recognition under Basel II and other Insolvency-related matters seen in the Lamfalussy Report has been resolved largely through trade association lobbying for law reform. In England and Wales, the effect of British Eagle International Airlines Ltd v Compagnie Nationale Air France has largely been negated by Part VII of the Company Act 1989 which allows netting in situations which are in relation to money market contracts. In regard to the BASEL Accords, the first set of guidelines, BASEL I, was missing guidelines on netting. BASEL II introduced netting guidelines.

=== Settlement netting ===
For cash settled trades, this can be applied either bilaterally or multilaterally and on related or unrelated transactions. Obligations are not modified under settlement netting, which relates only to the manner in which obligations are discharged. Unlike close-out netting, settlement netting is only possible in relation to like-obligations having the same settlement date. These dates must fall due on the same day and be in the same currency, but can be agreed in advance. Claims exist but are extinguished when paid. To achieve simultaneous payment, only the act of payment extinguishes the claim on both sides. This has the disadvantage that through the life of the netting, the debts are outstanding and netting will likely not occur, the effect of this on insolvency was seen in the above-mentioned British Eagle. These are routinely included within derivative transactions as they reduce the number and volume of payments and deliveries that take place but crucially does not reduce the pre-settlement exposure amount.

- Bilateral Net Settlement System: A settlement system in which every individual bilateral combination of participants settles its net settlement position on a bilateral basis.

- Multilateral Net Settlement System: A settlement system in which each settling participant settles its own multilateral net settlement position (typically by means of a single payment or receipt).

== Set-off ==
Set-off, also sometimes "set off", is a legal event and therefore legal basis is required for the proposition that two or more gross claims are to be netted. Of these legal bases, a common form is the legal defense of set-off, which was originally introduced to prevent the unfair situation whereby a person ("Party A") who owed money to another ("Party B") could be sent to debtors' prison, despite the fact that Party B also owed money to Party A. The law thus allows both parties to defer payment until their respective claims have been heard in court. This operated as an equitable shield, but not a sword. Upon judgment, both claims are extinguished and replaced by a single net sum owing (e.g. If Party A owes Party B 100 and Party B owes Party A 105, the two sums are set off and replaced with a single obligation of 5 from Party B to Party A). Set-off can also be incorporated by contractual agreement so that, where a party defaults, the mutual amounts owing are automatically set off and extinguished.

In certain jurisdictions, including the UK, certain types of set-off take place automatically upon the insolvency of a company. This means that, for each party which is both a creditor and debtor of the insolvent company, mutual debts are set-off against each other, and then either the bankrupt's creditor can claim the balance in the bankruptcy or the trustee in bankruptcy can ask for the balance remaining to be paid, depending on which side owed the most. This principle has been criticized as an undeclared security interest which violates the principle of pari passu. The alternative, where a creditor has to pay all its debts, but receives only a limited portion of the leftover moneys that other unsecured creditors get, poses the danger of 'knock-on' insolvencies, and thus a systemic market risk. Even still, three core reasons underpin and justify the use of set-off. First, the law should uphold pre-insolvency autonomy and set-offs as parties invariably rely on the pre-insolvency commitments. This is a core policy point. Second, as a matter of fairness and efficiency both outside and inside insolvency reduces negotiation and enforcement costs. Third, managing risk, particularly systemic risk, is crucial. Clearing house rules offer stipulation that relationships with buyer and sellers are replaced by two relationships between buyer and clearing house, and seller and clearing out. The effect is an automatic novation, meaning all elements are internalized in current accounts. This can be in different currencies as long as they are converted during calculation.

The right to set off is particularly important when a bank's exposures are reported to regulatory authorities, as is the case in the EU under financial collateral requirements. If a bank has to report that it has lent a large sum to a borrower and so is exposed because of the risk that the borrower might default, thereby leading to the loss of the money of the bank or its depositors, is thus replaced. The bank has taken security over shares or securities of the borrower with an exposure of the money lent, less the value of the security taken.

There are financial regulations pertaining to netting set out by certain trade associations. The British International Freight Association (BIFA) standard trading conditions do not permit set-off.

=== Set-off by jurisdiction ===
==== Canadian law ====
Canadian case-law in relation to set-off in construction contracts includes:

- Swagger Construction Ltd v. University of British Columbia (2000): the British Columbia Supreme Court ruled that "when a claim is made by a Contractor for the price of work and labour done, the Owner is entitled, in the absence of a provision in the Contract to the contrary, to set-off against the amount claimed any damages which he has suffered as a result of the Contractor's breach of the Contract".
- Armenia Rugs/Tapis v. Axor Construction Canada, an Ontario case relating to sub-contracted work on the RCMP building in Ottawa. The judge's ruling made reference to both statutory or legal set-off, and equitable set-off, which apply under Canadian law.

==== English law ====
Under English law, there are broadly five types of set-off which have been recognised:

1. Legal set-off or independent set-off, also known as statutory set-off: this arises where a claim and a counterclaim in a court action are both liquidated sums or ascertained with certainty. This is wider than insolvent set-off, but the claim and cross claim must be mutual and liquidated. In such cases the court will simply set-off the amounts and award a net sum. The two claims do not need to be intrinsically connected.
2. Equitable set-off or transaction set-off: outside of litigation, where two mutual claims arise out of the same matter or a sufficiently closely related matter, the claims will set off in equity, but only if it would be unjust to enforce one claim and not the other. Both sums must be due and payable, but may be for liquidated or unliquidated sums. Unlike Independent set-off, this is not self-executing. As developed in case law:
  - Rawson v Samuel (1848) was an established leading case which held that equitable set-off was available as a defence when "the title of the Plaintiff to his demand is impeached", for example when a contractual claim for payment is made but the debtor makes a claim for unliquidated damages.
  - a sub silentio precedent was established in Hanak v Green (1958) supporting the proposition that "unliquidated cross-claim may be set-off against an unliquidated primary claim". Dillon LJ described the judgment of Morris LJ in this case as "authoritative" while Diplock LJ described it as a "masterly account" of the defence of equitable set-off.
  - Hoffmann LJ stated in Aectra Refining and Marketing v Exmar NV in 1994 that an arbitration agreement in respect of one transaction should give way to a claim for litigation where "a wider examination of related facts" which would not be addressed in arbitration showed a potential for transaction set-off to apply across a combination of claims and counter-claims.
  - a 2010 Court of Appeal case involving Geldof Mettalconstructie NV and Simon Carves Ltd. looked at claims by two companies in relation to two contracts between them, one to supply goods, and the other to install them, which had been separately awarded. The court found sufficient connection between the two contracts to allow the claim under the installation contract to be set off against the claim under the supply contract.
3. Contractual set-off, made by express agreement: often netting will arise through express agreement to the parties. The ISDA master agreement is an example of this type, which is ineffective against an insolvent party but is often used to address pre-insolvency credit risk and reduce the need for collateral.
4. Banker's set-off or current account set-off: sometimes referred to as a banker's right to combine accounts, this is a special form of set-off which is implied into contractual agreements with bankers and allows banks to offset sums in one account against another account which is overdrawn from the same client. However, the right cannot be exercised if one of the accounts is a loan account, or if the bank has agreed not to exercise the right, or if the bank has notice that the sums in the account are for a specific purpose, or on trust for another party. It is said to derive from a banker's lien; however, this is misleading as it is only available where both accounts are maintained in the same capacity. Difference in currency will not prevent this right, however.
5. Insolvency set-off: perhaps the most expensive form of set-off. Under section 323 of the Insolvency Act 1986, where a person goes into bankruptcy or a company goes into liquidation, mutual debts are automatically set-off. This is a mandatory operation in bilateral situations. Whether the debt is liquidated or unliquidated does not matter, and the set-off will apply to future or contingent claims if the debts are provable. Insolvency set-off operates on liquidation and administration, where the administrator gives notice of his intention to make a distribution.

The five types of set-off are extremely important as a matter of efficiency and of mitigating risk. Contractual set-offs are recognised as an incident of party autonomy whereas a banker's right of combination is considered a fundamental implied term. It is an essential aspect for cross-claims, especially when there exits overlapping obligations. Common features of set-off are that they are confined to situations where claim and cross claim are for money or reducible to money and it requires mutuality.

==== European Union law ====
European Union law governs set-off through the Financial Collateral Directive 2002/47/EC.

==== US law ====
The Statute of Limitations prevents court action to recover overpayment after 6 years, but legislation enacted in 1983 allows overpayments to be recovered by "administrative setoff" for up to ten years.

See De Magno v. United States, 636 F.2d 714, 727 (D.C. Cir. 1980) (district court had jurisdiction over claim involving VA's “affirmative action against an individual whether by bringing an action to recover on an asserted claim or by proceeding on its common-law right of set-off”) (discussing similar language of predecessor statute, 38 U.S.C. § 211).

See, e.g., United States v. Munsey Trust Co., 332 U.S. 234, 239, 67 S.Ct. 1599, 1601, 91 L.Ed. 2022 (1947) ("government has the same right 'which belongs to every creditor, to apply the unappropriated moneys of his debtor, in his hands, in extinguishment of the debts due to him' " (quoting Gratiot v. United States, 40 U.S. (15 Pet.) 336, 370, 10 L.Ed. 759 (1841))); see also Tatelbaum v. United States, 10 Cl.Ct. 207, 210 (1986) (set-off right is inherent in the United States government and grounded on common law right of every creditor to set off debts).
