= Banker's lien =

A banker's lien is a legal right arise in many common law jurisdictions of a bank to exercise a lien over any property in the custody of the bank as security. Lien is of two types:

1. Particular lien
2. General lien

Particular lien confers to retain the goods in connection with which a particular debt arose i.e. A particular lien applies to one transaction or certain transaction only. e.g. a tailor has the right to certain the clothes made by him for his customer until his tailoring charges are paid by customer.

== Scope ==
The precise effect of a banker's lien varies according to the laws of a particular jurisdiction. Under English common law it applies to all property coming into the possession of the bank in the usual course of banking business, subject to the important exception that it does not apply to property which is deposited with the bank for safe custody.

Whilst most common law liens normally only give the lienee a passive right to retain the property, unusually, the banker's lien permits the bank to sell the relevant property.

The lien does not generally extend to intangible rights, including credit balances on accounts. However those credit balances may be subject to the banker's right to combine accounts.

The banker's lien may be modified or abrogated by agreement.
