= 932 Hooveria =

Main-belt asteroid

Discovery
- Discovered by: J. Palisa
- Discovery site: Vienna Obs.
- Discovery date: 23 March 1920

Designations
- Named after: Herbert Hoover (U.S. Secretary of Commerce)
- Alternative designations: A920 FC · 1920 GV; A909 GG · 1909 GG; A912 BD · 1912 BD; A913 MD · 1913 MD; A914 TF · 1914 TF; 1950 HQ
- Minor planet category: main-belt · (inner) background

Orbital characteristics
- Epoch 31 May 2020 (JD 2459000.5)
- Uncertainty parameter 0
- Observation arc: 99.79 yr (36,448 d)
- Aphelion: 2.6386 AU
- Perihelion: 2.2002 AU
- Semi-major axis: 2.4194 AU
- Eccentricity: 0.0906
- Orbital period (sidereal): 3.76 yr (1,375 d)
- Mean anomaly: 331.44°
- Mean motion: 0° 15^{m} 42.84^{s} / day
- Inclination: 8.1137°
- Longitude of ascending node: 14.956°
- Argument of perihelion: 50.025°

Physical characteristics
- Mean diameter: 58.978±0.804 km; 60.20±0.71 km
- Synodic rotation period: 78.44±0.01 h
- Geometric albedo: 0.049±0.001; 0.051±0.006
- Spectral type: Tholen = CB; Caa (S3OS2-TH); Ch (S3OS2-BB); B–V = 0.673±0.018; U–B = 0.328±0.040
- Absolute magnitude (H): 10.00; 10.1

932 Hooveria (prov. designation: A920 FC or 1920 GV) is a dark background asteroid, approximately 59 kilometers (37 miles) in diameter, located in the inner region of the asteroid belt. It was discovered by Austrian astronomer Johann Palisa at the Vienna Observatory on 23 March 1920. The carbonaceous C-type asteroid (Ch) has a long rotation period of 78.4 hours. It was named after then-Secretary of Commerce Herbert Hoover (1874–1964), who later became president of the United States.

== Orbit and classification ==
Hooveria is a non-family asteroid of the main belt's background population when applying the hierarchical clustering method to its proper orbital elements. It orbits the Sun in the inner asteroid belt at a distance of 2.2–2.6 AU once every 3 years and 9 months (1,375 days; semi-major axis of 2.42 AU). Its orbit has an eccentricity of 0.09 and an inclination of 8° with respect to the ecliptic. The asteroid was first observed as A909 GG (1909 GG) at Heidelberg Observatory on 16 April 1909. The body's observation arc begins with its official discovery observation at Vienna Observatory on 23 March 1920.

== Naming ==
This minor planet was named by the Academic Senate of the Vienna University in honor of then-Secretary of Commerce Herbert Hoover (1874–1964), in recognition of his help to Austria after World War I. The naming was mentioned in the Astronomische Nachrichten in 1922 (AN 216, 192). Hoover became the 31st president of the United States from 1929 to 1933. A second asteroid 1363 Herberta was also named after him in 1938.

Another of Palisa's discoveries, asteroid 941 Murray, was also named in appreciation for the help provided to post-war Austria. In this case, it was named after British classical scholar and diplomat Gilbert Murray (1866–1957).

== Physical characteristics ==
In the Tholen classification, Hooveria is classified as a CB-asteroid, closest to a carbonaceous C-type and somewhat similar to a brighter B-type asteroid. In the Small Solar System Objects Spectroscopic Survey (S3OS2), the asteroid is a Caa-type in the survey's Tholen-like taxonomy, and a hydrated Ch-subtype in the SMASS-like taxonomy of the S3OS2.

=== Rotation period ===
In December 2016, a rotational lightcurve of Hooveria was obtained from photometric observations by Anna Marciniak at the Poznań Observatory and other observers around the world during a survey, that collected spin and shape properties of long-period main-belt asteroids. Lightcurve analysis gave a well-defined rotation period of 78.44±0.01 hours with a brightness variation of 0.24±0.02 magnitude (U=3). The results supersede observations by Brian Warner at the Palmer Divide Observatory (716) and collaborators from February 2010, which gave a rotation period 39.1±0.1 hours (or half the period solution) with a brightness amplitude of 0.22±0.02 magnitude (U=2+). (Note: Lightcurve plot of (932) Hooveria, Palmer Divide Observatory, Brian Warner (2010). Rotation period 39.1±0.1 hours with a brightness amplitude of 0.22±0.02 mag. Quality code of 2+. Summary figures for (932) Hooveria at the LCDB)

=== Diameter and albedo ===
According to the survey carried out by the NEOWISE mission of NASA's Wide-field Infrared Survey Explorer (WISE) and the Japanese Akari satellite, Hooveria measures (58.978±0.804) and (60.20±0.71) kilometers in diameter and its surface has an albedo of (0.051±0.006) and (0.049±0.001), respectively. The Collaborative Asteroid Lightcurve Link assumes an albedo of 0.20 and calculates a diameter of 29.72 km based on an absolute magnitude of 10.00.

Further published mean-diameters and albedos by the WISE team include (59.101±21.01 km), (60.54±17.87 km), (61.70±21.32 km) and (62.973±1.412 km) with corresponding albedos of (0.0347±0.0290), (0.04±0.08), (0.03±0.02), and (0.0296±0.0039). An asteroid occultation on 1 February 2006, gave a best-fit ellipse dimension of 33.0 × 33.0 kilometers. These timed observations are taken when the asteroid passes in front of a distant star. However the quality of the measurement is poorly rated.
