= Stephen Murray (local politician) =

British barrister & politician (1908–1994)

Stephen Hubert Murray (1908–1994) was an English barrister, known as a local politician. He was a chairman of Cumbria County Council, and was prominent in enquiries into the expansion of Windscale (later Sellafield). An avowed Communist of the Spanish Civil War period, he was treated with suspicion by the British security services for some time afterwards.

== Early life ==
He was the third son and fifth child of Gilbert Murray and Lady Mary Howard, eldest daughter of George Howard, 9th Earl of Carlisle, and was born in Oxford. He was the younger brother of Basil Murray.

Polly Toynbee commented in her extended-family history An Uneasy Inheritance: My Family and other Radicals on the Murrays and their children:

What sent the children off the rails in one direction or another was ... likely to be their parents' overwhelming and crushing moralism. The idea that every aspect of one's life should be devoted to doing good must have been oppressive beyond bearing.

Stephen Murray attended Shrewsbury School, and was an engineering and law student at Balliol College, Oxford from 1927. He joined the University Motor Cycle Club. Like Reginald Holme, another member of the club, he took part in the 1929 Isle of Man TT. With Holme, he joined the Oxford Group founded by Frank Buchman; he didn't remain a supporter of Buchman, though Holme did. He also raced cars: John Platts-Mills wrote later

Stephen was an idle fellow except when it came to racing motor cars. He founded the University Motor Club and went rallying, but did nothing by way of study or passing exams. Stephen had asked me to go with him to a cocoa party for Oxford Group supporters at Somerville where, on a special occasion, the young ladies would be allowed to stay up until nine o'clock. We heard a number of girls make confessions, on their knees in the centre of the room, tearfully and prayerfully. The confessions were about the most humdrum little things like being late for something or forgetting something. This was too much for us. Stephen devised a number of horrible-sounding vices with Greek names, crawled into the middle of the room, and there knelt and confessed.

Murray was sent down from Balliol at the end of November 1929.

== Barrister ==
Murray worked for a time as an engineer. He was called to the bar in 1935, at the Inner Temple, and was taken on by the chambers of the barrister Cyril Miller.

At the time of the Spanish coup of July 1936, Murray joined the Communist Party of Great Britain (CPGB), leaving it in 1939 at the time of Molotov–Ribbentrop Pact. He accepted cases on behalf of the National Council for Civil Liberties (NCCL). Bernard O'Donnell's Cavalcade of Justice mentions him as defence lawyer in the 1939 River Thames collision case, of a rum-tum with a rowing eight. As "Edwards v Quickenden", it became a leading case on tidal waters and the definition of vessel.

On 16 March 1939, as the Nazi Protectorate of Bohemia and Moravia was announced, the Prague lawyer Ivan Sekanina was arrested by the Gestapo. Murray travelled to Berlin in June to try to clarify his condition, representing a concerned British group including Members of Parliament and the NCCL. The French advocate Étienne Nouveau followed up on a similar mission, in August.

== Hampstead Councillor ==
In 1938 Murray was adopted as a Labour Party candidate for the West End ward of Hampstead, and was elected at a by-election. At the end of March 1939 he chaired a Hampstead Town Hall meeting for Stafford Cripps, proponent of a petition for a popular front, expelled from the Labour Party in January of that year for his views.

== World War II ==
Murray spent the war years in London. In 1941 he chaired meetings of Hampstead civil defence workers for the TGWU.

=== MI5 and attempts to join the armed forces ===
Christopher Andrew mentioned Murray in relation to the release of Security Service files in 2016:

The aspect of British Communist history during the early Cold War on which least research has been done so far is on the secret Communists who, in agreement with the leadership, concealed their Party membership. Some details of the little-studied secret Communist Party lawyers group during the Second World War are in the two-volume file of the lawyer Stephen Murray, which begins at KV2/4266.

Andrew's 2012 official history of MI5 identified section F2a as covering surveillance of the CPGB.

Cyril Miller had been in the Royal Flying Corps in World War I, and joined the RAFVR. Murray gained an aviator certificate from the Royal Aero Club on 18 February 1939, at the Herts and Essex Aero Club. His obituarist Ronald Bernstein wrote of his reaction to the outbreak of war in September 1939:

He had taken flying lessons and when war broke out in 1939 he joined the RAF with the rank of Pilot Officer. But MI5 cancelled the appointment, presumably because of his Communist associations, and blocked his further attempts to join the Forces.

David Caute, citing the file KV2/4266, identified Wendy Ogilvie of F2a with the further restriction in 1943, after Murray had joined the Home Guard in 1942, that he should not be allowed a commission as officer. Murray was subject to postal interception, especially in 1942. MI5's concerns centred on the hypothesis of Murray's covert involvement with a group of Communist lawyers.

A 1943 Picture Post photograph kept on file by MI5 showed a Hampstead group including Murray with Francis Klingender, E. L. T. Mesens and Tom O'Brien.

=== Pacifism ===
Murray was expelled from the Labour Party early in 1940; a newspaper article from December of that year claimed it was for his "stop the war" activities. Murray was quoted: "If and when the war becomes a People's War, by reason of its being waged under a People's Government, the interest of the workers in it will be such as to justify every ounce of effort on their part..." In July he had taken over as chairman of the Hampstead Peace Council. He supported the People's Convention.

=== Professional activities ===
Late in 1939, Murray defended Elsy Borders on a charge of assaulting a sheriff's officer (bailiff). He argued that the officer's warrant to enter a property was invalid under recent emergency powers. Murray also acted as lawyer for the Stepney Tenants' Defence League (STDL). He was counsel for the STDL as defendants in a civil case in June 1940 involving injunctions against the rent strike organiser Maurice "Tubby" Rosen.

Murray acted as junior in admiralty cases to Cyril Miller, up to 1940. Miller joined the Special Operations Executive in 1942, as a case officer. Murray spent a period in the chambers of Denis Pritt.

In 1944 Murray defended the Indian journalist and independence activist Suresh Vaidya, in a court martial at Brighton. Vaidya was resident in the United Kingdom from 1932, and was a conscientious objector. James Maxton had questioned Ernest Bevin on the case in the House of Commons on 17 February of that year.

=== Haldane Society ===
In 1941 Murray was the secretary of the Haldane Society of Socialist Lawyers, of which John Platts-Mills was the chairman. The Society published a pamphlet, The Law and Reconstruction, with proposals including legal aid. Murray with two other members of the Haldane Society, Edgar Duchin and Robert Pollard, gave written evidence on legal aid to the committee chaired by Lord Rushcliffe, on 25 October 1944, based on an earlier report compiled by the solicitor Philip Robert Kimber, and the pamphlet.

== Post-war to 1950 ==
In 1947, Murray took up the case of a Polish soldier of the Polish Armed Forces in the West, which was on the point of being disbanded. Eugeniusz Zytomirski claimed he was being held illegally, at Iscoyd Park, in a military hospital, and went on hunger strike. In the House of Commons on 12 February of that year, Woodrow Wyatt referred to the habeas corpus case before Lord Goddard decided the previous day, in Zytomirski's favour. He had claimed that he was being coerced to join the Polish Resettlement Corps. The Attorney-General Hartley Shawcross's case that Zytomirski was being detained as a lunatic was ruled against, on the grounds that the Polish Army would have no power to do so even if that were true. Wyatt claimed that the Polish Army had become "largest illegal private army ever known in this country", and argued that those in it not wishing to join the Polish Resettlement Corps needed legal status.

=== Haldane Society schism ===
Gerald Gardiner, who campaigned against communist influence in the Society, was chairman from 1945 to 1947. Murray succeeded him, and at the 1947 AGM expressed the hope that the Society would not become a battleground.

In 1948, an intelligence report stated that, with Murray as chairman of the Society, were John Elton as secretary, and Duchin as treasurer. At that year's AGM, Gardiner proposed a constitutional change designed to exclude communists from the Haldane Society's executive; then Harold William Paton proposed a more fundamental change that would exclude them entirely. Murray in the chair accepted the Paton motion; the communist activist Ralph Millner then moved that Murray should be replaced in the chair, and Isadore Caplan took his place. The Gardiner motion was defeated by a vote at the meeting. The Paton motion was then taken up by the executive, which was split on it. In a ballot of the membership in March 1949, the required two-thirds majority for the Paton change of constitution was not obtained. There resulted numerous resignations from the Haldane Society, which withdrew from its Labour Party affiliation.

=== Aftermath, change of chambers ===
In January 1949 Murray found himself on the opposite side of the Haldane Society debate from Denis Pritt, one of those who was calling for a Special General Meeting on the Paton motion. He commented "The distressing feature of this controversy is that it involves Communist members who have never behaved with other than the highest integrity on the Society's domestic matters." That year, he moved to the chambers of Harold Heathcote-Williams.

After leaving the Haldane Society, Murray joined the Society of Labour Lawyers, and prepared a report for them on the reform of the law on leasehold property. He contributed to the 1951 book The Reform of the Law, edited by Gardiner.

== Cumbrian farmer and local politician ==
In 1951, Lady Mary Murray passed on to Stephen and his sister Rosalind, married to Arnold Toynbee, some land from the Howard estate in Cumberland. At the end of the year Stephen Murray gave up his legal career in London, and moved with his family to Greenside farm, near Hallbankgate. He began to farm there, raising sheep and cattle.

Murray was elected to the Border Rural District Council in 1953, and chaired it during the 1960s. In 1955 he stood at Alston for election to the Cumberland County Council, as a Socialist. Disliking the delegation of local government decisions to party caucuses, when he stood successfully for Cumberland County Council in 1964, it was as an Independent. It was for the Farlam electoral division, and was a family affair of three Independent candidates, his opponents being Charles Howard, 12th Earl of Carlisle and Christina Wood, daughter of Charles Roberts. After T. Dan Smith was made chairman of the Northern Economic Development Council in 1965, Murray was in 1966 vice-chairman, and raised concerns about the future of RAF Spadeadam.

Murray remained on the Cumberland County Council until 1974 and the Local Government Act. He chaired the Border Rural District Council from 1964 to 1966; and Cumbria County Council, as it became, from 1985 to 1987.

=== Windscale ===
There was a planning application in June 1976 for the Windscale and Calder Works, at the site now known as Sellafield, in south-west Cumbria. British Nuclear Fuels Ltd (BNFL) applied to Copeland Borough Council, who escalated it to Cumbria County Council. Murray was on the Town and Planning Committee for Cumbria, and in his personal capacity wrote to The Times, saying that he thought the Secretary of State for the Environment should intervene. He arranged a public meeting on the issue in Whitehaven, in September of that year.

By early November the Cumbria County Council had referred the matter to the minister Peter Shore, and in December he told the House of Commons that the part of the application that concerned processing of oxide nuclear fuel he would deal with himself, on the basis of a public inquiry; and was inviting to BNFL to divide the proposal. BNFL did re-apply for the fuel processing in March 1977, and after an inquiry the application was authorised by Shore under a special order in 1978.

== Works ==
- War Damage Act, 1941: The Official Text of the Act, Together with a Full and Comprehensive Index (1941)
- Every Man His Own Shipwright (1950), writing as James T. Bell with Margaret Murray. Murray belonged to the Royal Ocean Racing Club and the Little Ship Club. He owned a yacht, around 1950, Our Jim at Fowey.

== Family ==
Murray married in 1931 Margaret Gillett, daughter of Joseph Rowntree Gillett of 5 Downshire Hill. She was registered as an architect, at 25 Downshire Hill, from 1933. In the mid-1930s the architects Charlotte and Michael Bunney designed 13 Downshire Hill, and later in the 1960s when they were at Kendal, Murray involved them in a housing estate at Wetheral.

The couple had four sons:

- Gilbert (1931–1963), a schoolmaster at Christ's College, Christchurch, New Zealand, when he died in a rock avalanche while climbing Fox Glacier.
- Alexander FBA (born 1934)
- Robert known as Robin (born 1940)
- Hubert (born 1946)

Margaret died in 1979, and Murray married again.

=== Gillett bankers ===
Margaret's background was the Gillett family of Quaker bankers in Banbury, both her parents being grandchildren of Joseph Ashby Gillett. Her mother Richenda Gillett MD (Brux.) worked as a medical officer of health in London; the daughter of Charles Gillett (1830–1895), she was a first cousin of her husband Joseph Rowntree Gillett, the son of George Gillett (1837–1893) and his wife Hannah Elizabeth Rowntree, daughter of Joseph Rowntree of York.

Her father Rowntree (1874–1940) was a pacifist of World War I, giving up his banking career; he was close to George Maitland Lloyd Davies, who wrote a memoir of him. He was connected to Balliol College through A. D. Lindsay, its Master in the 1920s, and a shared interest in the Maes yr Haf Education Settlement at Trealaw, in The Rhondda.
