= Joseph Toynbee =

English otologist (1815–1866)

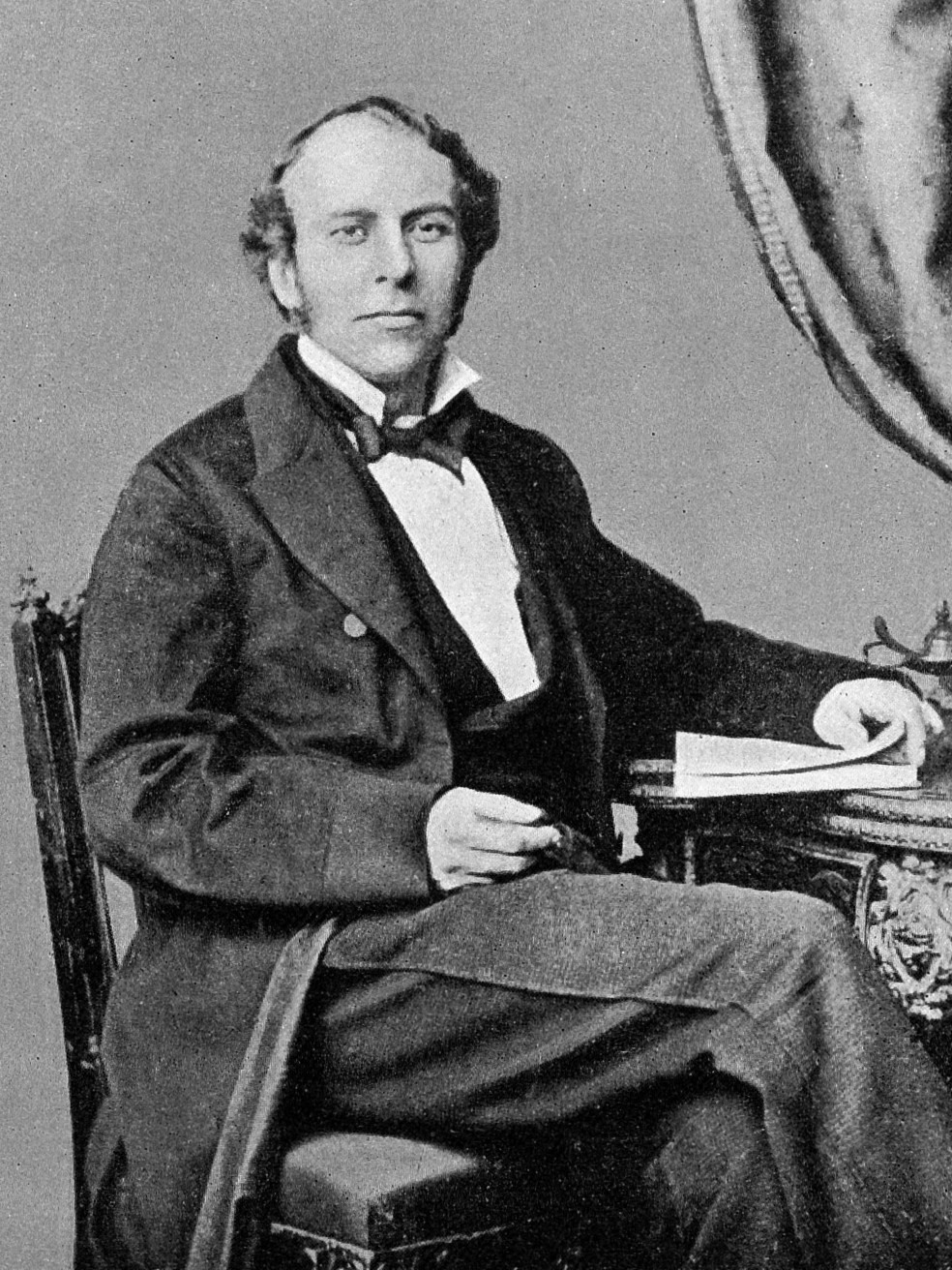
- Joseph Toynbee, published in 1910
- Born: 30 December 1815; Heckington, Lincolnshire, England
- Died: 7 July 1866 (aged 50)
- Known for: pathological and anatomical studies of the ear
- Children: Arnold Toynbee; Grace Frankland
- Scientific career
- Fields: Otologist

Joseph Toynbee FRS (30 December 1815 – 7 July 1866) was an English otologist whose career was dedicated to pathological and anatomical studies of the ear.

== Personal life ==
Joseph Toynbee was born in Heckington, Lincolnshire on 30 December 1815, and baptised there on 2 January 1816. He was the third son of fifteen children of the wealthy land owner and farmer George Toynbee (1783–1865). George's first wife and the mother of Joseph, was Elizabeth, (maiden surname of Cullen, 1785–1820). Joseph's parents were married at Bracebridge, Lincolnshire, on 21 May 1811, by Licence.

After several years of private tuition, he attended King's Lynn Grammar School in Norfolk. At the age of seventeen he studied medicine. His first experience in medicine came when he was apprenticed to William Wade of the Westminster General Dispensary in Gerrard Street in London's Soho. He studied anatomy under George Derby Dermott (1802–1847) at Hunterian Medical School at the Great Windmill Street, and later gained a reputation as a prosector.

Joseph married Harriet Holmes, a daughter of Nathaniel Reynolds Holmes, on 4 August 1846, at St John's Church, Hampstead. The couple were married by Licence. They had nine children together, including economic historian Arnold Toynbee (1852–1883), the Dante scholar Paget Toynbee (1855–1932) and the bacteriologist Grace Frankland (née Toynbee, 1858–1946).

Another son, Harry Valpy Toynbee (1861–1941), was the father of universal historian Arnold J. Toynbee, and archaeologist and art historian Jocelyn Toynbee.

He died on 7 July 1866, at 18, Savile Row, Mayfair, while conducting experiments with prussic acid and chloroform as a remedy for tinnitus. Either one of these substances or their combination is to blame for his death. He was buried at St Mary's Church, Wimbledon, on 11 July 1866. Joseph's residence on the burial register was listed as Wimbledon. He lived at Beech Holme, Wimbledon. A drinking fountain dedicated to his memory stands near to his home.

== Career ==
He performed studies on the functionality of the Eustachian tube and tympanic membrane, and developed a form of tympanoplasty to restore function to the latter when damaged. When St. Mary's Hospital was founded in Paddington, he a became an aural surgeon and a lecturer on ear diseases—his course of clinical lectures being published in 1855 and 1866. During this time period he composed two major works: "A Descriptive Catalogue of Preparations Illustrative of the Diseases of the Ear" (1857), and "The Diseases of the Ear: Their Nature, Diagnosis and Treatment" (1860). From his many dissections of "deaf ears", he studied ankylosis of the stapes.

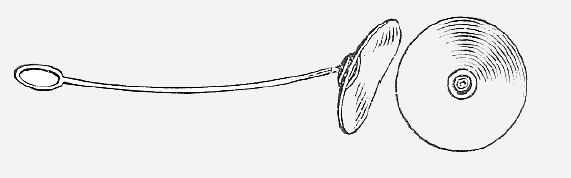
Joseph Toynbee's artificial tympanic membrane made of gutta percha attached to a silver wire stem.

He was elected a Fellow of the Royal Society in March 1842.

Austrian otologist Adam Politzer (1835–1920) penned biographies in French (1905) and German (1914) honoring Toynbee, whom Politzer regarded as a major influence.

== Works ==
- On the structure of the membrana tympani in the human ear. Richard Taylor, London 1851
- On the use of an artificial membrana tympani in cases of deafness : dependent upon perforation or destruction of the natural organ. J. Churchill, London 1857
- A Descriptive Catalogue of Preparations illustrative of the Diseases of the Ear in the Museum of Joseph Toynbee. J. Churchill, London 1857
- The Diseases of the Ear: Their Nature, Diagnosis, and Treatment. Blanchard and Lea, 1860
- Hints on the Formation of Local Museums. Robert Hardwicke, 1863

== See also ==
- Toynbee maneuver

== Toynbee genealogy ==
Beginning with Joseph, the Toynbees have been prominent in British intellectual society for several generations (note that this diagram is not a comprehensive Toynbee family tree):

Joseph Toynbee; Pioneering otolaryngologist	Harriet Holmes
Arnold Toynbee; Economic historian	Harry Valpy Toynbee	Gilbert Murray; Classicist and public intellectual	Lady Mary Howard
Arnold J. Toynbee; Universal historian	Rosalind Murray; 1890–1967
Antony Harry Toynbee; 1914–39	Philip Toynbee; Writer and journalist	Anne Powell	Lawrence Toynbee b. 1922
Josephine Toynbee	Polly Toynbee; Journalist
