= Arnold Toynbee (historian, born 1852) =

English economic historian (1852–1883)

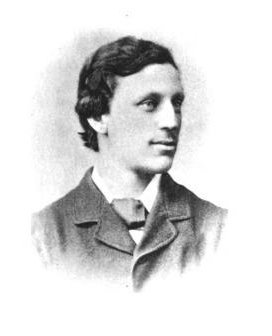
- Born: 23 August 1852; Savile Row, London, England
- Died: 9 March 1883 (aged 30); Wimbledon, London, England
- Education: Balliol College, Oxford
- Scientific career
- Fields: Economic history

Arnold Toynbee (/ˈtɔɪnbi/; 23 August 1852 – 9 March 1883) was an English economic historian also noted for his social commitment and desire to improve the living conditions of the working classes. Toynbee Hall in London was named in his honour.

== Life and career ==
Toynbee was born in London, the son of the physician Joseph Toynbee, a pioneering otolaryngologist. One of nine children, his sister was the bacteriologist Grace Frankland, and his brother was Paget Toynbee, the Dante scholar.

Toynbee was the uncle, via his brother Harry Valpy Toynbee, of universal historian Arnold Joseph Toynbee (1889–1975). The two are often confused due to the similarity of their names.

Toynbee attended public schools in Blackheath and Woolwich. In 1873 he began to study political economy at Oxford University, first at Pembroke College and from 1875 at Balliol College, where he went on to teach after his graduation in 1878. He was deeply influenced by John Ruskin while at Oxford. W. G. Collingwood states that Toynbee was one of Ruskin's warmest admirers and ablest pupils. He further notes that the philanthropic work of Toynbee truly illustrated the teaching of one of Ruskin's greatest books, Unto This Last. His lectures on the history of the Industrial Revolution in 18th- and 19th-century Britain proved widely influential; in fact, Toynbee coined, or at least effectively popularised, the term "Industrial Revolution" in the Anglophone world—in Germany and elsewhere it had been brought into circulation earlier by Friedrich Engels, also under the impression of the industrial changes in Britain.

He married the college administrator Charlotte Atwood on 26 June 1879. His wife was 12 years his senior and a cousin of Harold Davidson, the famous Rector of Stiffkey.

Toynbee died in 1883, at age 30. His health had rapidly deteriorated, probably due to exhaustion by excessive work . Frederick Rogers notes that the publication of Henry George's Progress and Poverty may be said to have brought about Toynbee's death:

As [Toynbee] saw the book, it was full of economic heresies, and he resolved to answer them. Of weak physique, but full of a passionate spiritual enthusiasm, he gave two lectures at St. Andrew's Hall, Oxford Street, against the book and the effort ended his career. He died for truth as he knew it, and those who knew him felt that his death was a national loss....

=== Toynbee genealogy ===
The Toynbees have been prominent in British intellectual society for several generations (this diagram is not a comprehensive Toynbee family tree):

Joseph Toynbee; Pioneering otolaryngologist 1815–1866	Harriet Holmes
Arnold Toynbee; Economic historian 1852–1883	Harry Valpy Toynbee	Gilbert Murray; Classicist and public intellectual 1866–1957	Lady Mary Howard
Arnold J. Toynbee; Universal historian 1889–1975	Rosalind Murray; 1890–1967
Antony Harry Toynbee; 1914–1939	Philip Toynbee; Writer and journalist 1916–1981	Anne Powell	Lawrence Toynbee; 1922–2002
Josephine Toynbee	Polly Toynbee; Journalist and atheist activist b. 1946

== Economic history ==
According to Toynbee, applying the historical method in economics would reveal how supposedly universal economic laws were, in fact, relative. For example, he argued that, despite commonly held beliefs, free trade was not generally advantageous in itself, but only under certain circumstances, which should not be considered absolute. Toynbee considered few laws universally true, such as the law of diminishing returns. Therefore, there were no universal rules as to how strongly the state should interfere in the marketplace; all depended on the situation and varying degrees of regulation could be appropriate.

Another idea Toynbee dismissed was that free competition was universally beneficial to economic and societal progress, especially as reflected in its apotheosis in Social Darwinism, which promoted laissez-faire capitalism. Toynbee did not equate "a struggle for mere existence and a struggle for a particular kind of existence". From the very beginning of history, he argued, all human civilisation was essentially designed to "interfere with this brute struggle. We intend to modify the violence of the fight, and to prevent the weak being trampled under foot." Although economic competition does have its advantages, being the driving force behind technical progress, these were "gained at the expense of an enormous waste of human life and labour, which might be avoided by regulation". Toynbee suggested a differentiation between competition in production on the one hand, and competition in the distribution of goods on the other:

... the struggle of men to outvie one another in production is beneficial to the community; their struggle over the division of the joint produce is not. The stronger side will dictate its own terms; and as a matter of fact, in the early days of competition, the capitalists used all their power to oppress the labourers, and drove down wages to starvation point. This kind of competition has to be checked; there is no historical instance of its having lasted long without being modified either by combination or legislation, or both. In England both remedies are in operation, the former through Trades Unions, the latter through factory legislation.

In itself, a market based on competition was neither good nor bad, but like "a stream whose strength and direction have to be observed, that embankments may be thrown up within which it may do its work harmlessly and beneficially". However, in the early phase of industrial capitalism "it came to be believed in as a gospel, ... from which it was regarded as little long of immoral to depart".

== Social commitment ==
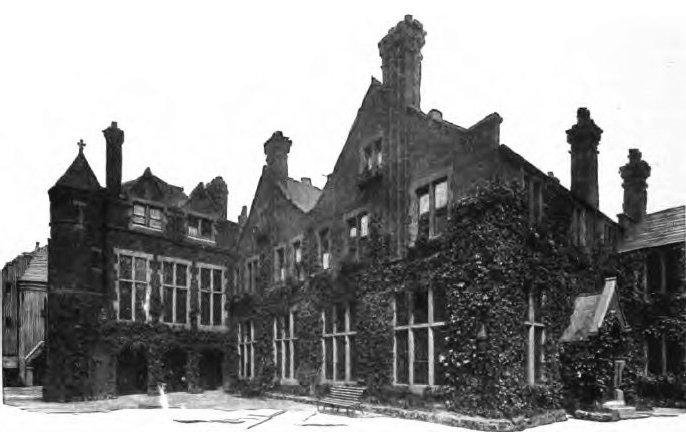
Toynbee Hall settlement house, Whitechapel, founded 1884, pictured in 1902

For Toynbee, early industrial capitalism and the situation of the working class in it was not just a subject of ivory-tower studies; he was actively involved in improving the living conditions of the labourer. He read for workers in large industrial centres and encouraged the creation of trade unions and co-operatives. A focal point of his commitment was the slum of Whitechapel, in East London, where he helped to establish public libraries for the working-class population. Toynbee also encouraged his students to offer free courses for working-class audiences in their own neighbourhoods.

Inspired by his ideas, Samuel Augustus Barnett and Henrietta Barnett founded the first university settlement in 1884, shortly after Toynbee's death; it was named Toynbee Hall in his honour. A centre for social reform, Toynbee Hall was on Commercial Street, Whitechapel. It remains active today. The concept was to bring upper and middle class students into lower-class neighbourhoods, not only to provide education and social aid, but to actually live and work together with their inhabitants. This soon inspired a worldwide movement of university settlements. The idea was to help members of the future elite understand the problems of British society; this was especially important at a time when class divisions were much stronger, social mobility was minimal, and the living conditions of the poor were completely unknown to many members of the upper class. Early chairs of trustees included Philip Lyttelton Gell and Lord Alfred Milner. Toynbee Hall attracted many students, especially from Oxford's Wadham College and Balliol College, where Toynbee had taught.

In 1916, the Arnold Toynbee House in New York was founded by a group of young adults who were part of the Stevenson Club at Madison House and with the help of philanthropist Rose Gruening. Eight years later, the settlement house was renamed Grand Street Settlement.

== Views on the Industrial Revolution ==
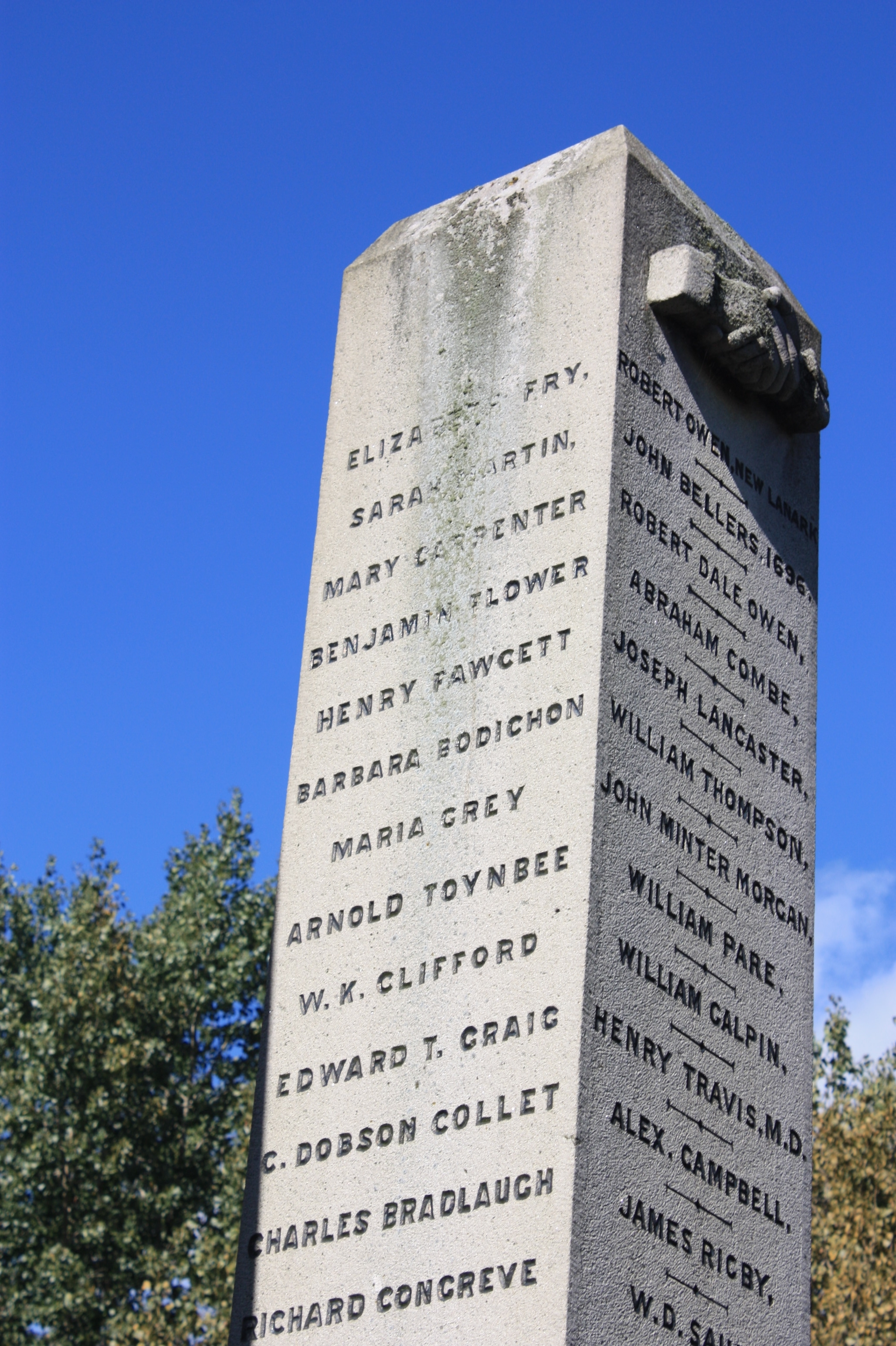
Toynbee's name on the Reformers Monument, Kensal Green Cemetery

Toynbee is widely accepted as the historian who ushered the expression "the industrial revolution" into the English language. Although French and German commentators had used this term in the early nineteenth century, English use had been rare and inconsistent until the posthumous publication of Toynbee's Lectures on the Industrial Revolution in England.

According to Toynbee, "the essence of the Industrial Revolution" was "the substitution of competition for the medieval regulations which had previously controlled the production and distribution of wealth". Among its components were an "agrarian revolution" that produced "the alienation between farmer and labourer" and in the manufacturing world, the appearance of a "new class of great capitalist employers". "The old relations between masters and men disappeared, and a 'cash nexus' was substituted for the human tie." Summing up his interpretation, Toynbee wrote, "the Wealth of Nations and the steam-engine...destroyed the old world and built a new one." For Toynbee, this coupling seemed self-evident. Steam-powered factories, the Wealth of Nations, competition, the cash-nexus and the rise of pauperism formed part of a single phenomenon.

In response to this bleak scenario, Toynbee proposed a test for when the state should become involved in the regulation of an economic or social sphere of society to even the balance between industry and labour. He proposed the "Radical Creed", which,

as I understand it, is this: We have not abandoned our old belief in liberty, justice, and Self-help, but we say that under certain conditions the people cannot help themselves, and that then they should be helped by the State representing directly the whole people. In giving this State help, we make three conditions: first, the matter must be one of primary social importance; next, it must be proved to be practicable; thirdly, the State interference must not diminish self-reliance. Even if the chance should arise of removing a great social evil, nothing must be done to weaken those habits of individual self-reliance and voluntary association which have built up the greatness of the English people.

== Works ==
- 1884: Lectures on the Industrial Revolution In England: Public Addresses, Notes and Other Fragments, together with a Short Memoir by B. Jowett, London, Rivington's (1884); Whitefish, Montana: Kessinger Publishing (pb 2004). ISBN 1-4191-2952-X.
- 1908: 1908 edition, revised and expanded
- New frontiers of knowledge; a symposium by distinguished writers, notable scholars & public figures by Arnold Toynbee et al. (Washington: Public Affairs Press, 1957)

== See also ==
- Industrial Revolution
- Settlement movement
- Toynbee Hall
- University extension

== Sources ==
- Chisholm, Hugh, ed. (1911). "Toynbee, Arnold" . Encyclopædia Britannica. Vol. 27 (11th ed.). Cambridge University Press.
- Milner, Alfred (1899). "Toynbee, Arnold" . In Lee, Sidney (ed.). Dictionary of National Biography. Vol. 57. London: Smith, Elder & Co.
- Millar, Fergus. "Toynbee, Arnold Joseph (1889–1975)". Oxford Dictionary of National Biography (online ed.). Oxford University Press. doi:10.1093/ref:odnb/31769. (Subscription, Wikipedia Library access or UK public library membership required.)
