= Percy F. Frankland =

British chemist (1858–1946)

Percy Faraday Frankland CBE FRS (3 October 1858 – 28 October 1946) was a British chemist.

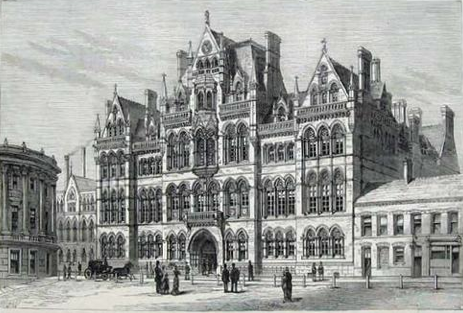
Mason Science College, now the University of Birmingham

He was the second son and youngest child of Edward Frankland, chemist, and Sophie Fick, sister of Adolf Eugen Fick. He was born at 42 Park Road, Haverstock Hill, Hampstead, on 3 October 1858. Michael Faraday was his godfather.

Letter from Frankland (1886)

Frankland attended University College School from 1869-1874. The following year he was admitted to the Royal School of Mines, where he was taught by his father, Frederick Guthrie, T H Huxley, Judd and Warington Smyth

Although he gained a Brackenbury scholarship to St Bartholomew's Hospital in 1878, and graduated with a BSc three years later, he was steered away from medicine to chemistry by his father. He studied for a PhD under Johannes Wislicenus at the University of Würzburg. Frankland returned to London in 1880, and became a demonstrator of practical chemistry at the Normal School of Science, South Kensington.

Frankland left London in 1888 to become Professor of Chemistry at Dundee, where his main scientific interests were in stereochemistry and in the preparation of pure cultures of bacilli, which were allowed to grow in solutions of sugars. Together with his wife, Grace Frankland, they isolated the first pure culture of nitrifying (ammonia-oxidizing) bacterium in 1890.

He then went to Birmingham in 1894 as Professor of what was then Mason College, where he succeeded Professor William A. Tilden. Frankland retired at the end of the First World War, aged 60. A list of his publications, from 1880-1920 is included in the Royal Society memoir.

Frankland was elected a Fellow of the Royal Society in June 1891. He was President of the Chemical Society from 1911 to 1913, a position his father had held before him. He was awarded the Royal Society's Davy Medal in 1919.

== Family ==
In 1882, Frankland married Grace (née Toynbee), the daughter of Joseph Toynbee. She worked with both Percy and his father and was described at the time as having "worthily aided and seconded [Percy]". The couple co-authored papers on bacteria and other microorganisms found in the air and water.

They lived at Grove House, Pembridge Square, London. Their only child, Edward Percy, was born in 1884. He married Maud Metcalfe-Gibson in 1915. The couple had two sons and a daughter: the parasitologist Helga Maud Toynbee Frankland, who wrote about her grandfather Percy and other family members.

Percy Faraday Frankland died on 28 October 1946 at the village of Loch Awe, Argyll. He was buried at Glenorchy parish church in Dalmally, with his wife, who had died on the 5th.

The University of Manchester Library holds the main collection of Frankland's papers. Archival material relating to him is also held by Archive Services, University of Dundee.
