= Hard work (disambiguation) =

Hard work may refer to a distinct but related concept of diligence.

Hard Work may also refer to:

- Hard Work (album), a 1976 album by John Handy
- Hard Work (song), a 2026 single by Naniwa Danshi
- Hard Work, a song by Ella Henderson, from the 2014 album Chapter One
- Hard Work: Life in Low-pay Britain, a 2003 book by Polly Toynbee
