= Arnold Toynbee =

Arnold Toynbee may refer to:

- Arnold Toynbee (historian, born 1852) (died 1883), British economic historian
- Arnold J. Toynbee (1889–1975), British historian and author of A Study of History
