= Ann Paludan =

British writer (1928–2014)

- Born: Ann Elizabeth Murray; 1928
- Died: 30 October 2014 (aged 85–86)
- Occupation: British writer
- Spouse(s): John Ernest Powell Jones (or Powell-Jones); Janus Paludan (d. 2004)
- Children: 3, including Mark

Ann Elizabeth Paludan (née Murray; 1928 – 30 October 2014) was a British author of several books on Chinese history, sculpture and architecture.

== Biography ==
Ann Paludan was one of two daughters of Pauline Mary (née Newton) and Basil Murray. Her father was the second son of the eminent classical scholar Gilbert Murray and his wife, Mary (née Howard). Ann would visit her grandparents at Yatscombe, on Boars Hill, particularly during her undergraduate years in St Hugh's College, Oxford when she cycled up to Yatscombe every Sunday.

Her parents had split up when she was young and her father died in Spain when she was eight, so her visits to her grandparents gave a welcome sense of continuity. On her mother's side she was the granddaughter of the painter Algernon Newton RA, of the family which founded the Winsor and Newton paints company, and a niece of actor Robert Newton. After graduating she worked as a British diplomat, marrying John Ernest Powell-Jones in December 1949 and starting a life abroad the same year.

Her son, Sir Mark Jones, was born on 5 February 1951; he is a art historian, and former museum director and master of St Cross College, Oxford from 2011 to 2016.

Janus Paludan (1920–2004), a Danish diplomat, had served as Danish Ambassador to the Congo 1962–1965 and to Brazil 1968–1972, and he and Ann married before he took up the post of Danish Ambassador to China in 1972. They lived in Beijing until 1976, and thereafter she returned regularly to China on research trips. He then served as Ambassador to Egypt in 1976 and to Iceland from 1977 to 1984, after which they retired to northern Cumbria. Janus Paludan died in 2004.

Ann Paludan died on 30 October 2014, aged 86.

== Books ==
Ann Paludan researched the history of China and wrote a number of authoritative and widely cited books:

- Ann Paludan (1981). The Imperial Ming tombs. Hong Kong University Press. ISBN 978-962-209-029-3.
- Ann Paludan (26 September 1991). The Ming tombs. Oxford University Press. ISBN 978-0-19-585003-1.
- Ann Paludan (1991). The Chinese spirit road: the classical tradition of stone tomb statuary. Yale University Press. ISBN 978-0-300-04597-0.
- Ann Paludan (24 November 1994). Chinese tomb figurines. Oxford University Press. ISBN 978-0-19-585817-4.
- Ann Paludan (2006). Chinese sculpture: a great tradition. Serindia Publications. ISBN 978-1-932476-28-6.
- Ann Paludan (6 April 2009). Chronicle of the Chinese Emperors: The Reign-By-Reign Record of the Rulers of Imperial China. Thames & Hudson. ISBN 978-0-500-28764-4.
