= Philip Toynbee =

British writer (1916–1981)

- Born: Theodore Philip Toynbee; 25 June 1916; Oxford, England, UK
- Died: 15 June 1981 (aged 64); St Briavels, Gloucestershire, England, UK
- Occupations: Writer, columnist
- Children: 5, including Polly Toynbee
- Parent(s): Arnold J. Toynbee, Rosalind Murray

Theodore Philip Toynbee (25 June 1916 – 15 June 1981) was a British writer and columnist. He wrote experimental novels, and distinctive verse novels, one of which was an epic called Pantaloon, a work in several volumes, only some of which are published. He also wrote memoirs of the 1930s, and reviews and literary criticism, the latter mainly via his employment with The Observer newspaper.

== Early life ==
He was born in Oxford; his father was the historian Arnold J. Toynbee, and his mother was Rosalind Murray. He was educated at Rugby School, where he became rebellious, reacting against the public school system. Inspired by the example of Esmond Romilly, later a friend, he ran away, returned shortly and was expelled. He later wrote a memoir of Romilly, and Jasper Ridley (1913–1944), entitled Friends Apart. Through Romilly, Toynbee met Jessica Mitford, who became a close friend after Esmond died in WWII. He was also influenced by bookshop owner and would-be encourager of the young radical element, David Archer, whom he met through David Gascoyne.

== Career and politics ==
At Christ Church, Oxford in the late 1930s he became the first communist president of the Oxford Union, at the height of communism's apparent success and social acceptability. He visited Spain at the end of 1936, at the start of the Spanish Civil War, in a student delegation. He was said to have been beaten up by Mosley's Blackshirts at a fascist meeting. In 1938–39 he edited the Birmingham Town Crier.

During the 1950s he continued to work for The Observer, and was one of the more prominent intellectual figures in British life (perhaps to be compared with Edmund Wilson in the United States, for example). In an article written for The Observer in 1961, he proclaimed the irrelevancy of J.R.R. Tolkien's The Lord of the Rings, just prior to its paperback publication in America and subsequent cultural phenomenon:

There was a time when the Hobbit fantasies of Professor Tolkien were being taken very seriously indeed by a great many distinguished literary figures. Mr. Auden is even reported to have claimed that these books were as good as War and Peace; Edwin Muir and many others were almost equally enthusiastic. I had a sense that one side or the other must be mad, for it seemed to me that these books were dull, ill-written, whimsical and childish. And for me this had a reassuring outcome, for most of his more ardent supporters were soon beginning to sell out their shares in Professor Tolkien, and today those books have passed into a merciful oblivion.

== Alternative lifestyle ==
In the early to mid-1970s, Toynbee underwent a personal crisis, entering into a period of deep depression. He had become increasingly concerned about ecological matters and this, along with his own ideological temperament, led him to the decision to set up a self-sufficient farming community. His family and friends thought this decision to be close to insane, considering as they did his privacy and routine-loving nature. The community quickly became a commune when Toynbee, Sally and their youngest daughter moved out into a cottage nearby. Nonetheless, Toynbee and Sally continued to have contact with the communards, and along with both spouses' active alcoholism, it frequently caused tension in their marriage.

Toynbee's depression was sometimes immobilising and prevented him from enjoying his day-to-day life and work, and the regularity of his book reviews was sometimes interrupted as he struggled with the depression and the treatment he insisted on receiving for it against the advice of his general practitioner and consultant: electroconvulsive therapy (ECT). He finally got the go-ahead for the treatment in 1977; he received it in Bristol that summer.

The two books that followed the ECT consisted of journal writings Toynbee decided to edit and send off for publication. These largely revolved around his search for some kind of spiritual meaning. It could be said that this arose out of his wish to find some purpose for the misery of his worst depression. He was urged to stop drinking alcohol and occasionally managed short periods of abstinence. Yet he never really wanted long-term abstinence enough to make any real success of this. He was as a whole capable of self-discipline, but needed to want his objectives with intense singular-mindedness in order to achieve them.

The two journal-books were entitled Part of a Journey (covering 1977 to 1979) and End of a Journey (1979 to 1981). They were generally well-received.

== Personal life ==
He married twice: in 1939, to Anne Powell, daughter of Lt-Col George Powell, and in 1950, Sally Smith.

In the early 1940s Philip and Anne lived a bohemian life in London's Fitzrovia, and Philip was drinking heavily. At that time they knew Lucian Freud, Donald Maclean and Robert Kee, Henrietta Moraes and others from David Tennant's Gargoyle Club in Soho. Toynbee was later to be found, with Benedict Nicolson, in the Wednesday Club consisting of raffish male writers, artists and journalists.

In 1945 they moved to the Isle of Wight, for a fresh start. They had two children, the second being Mary Louisa, better known as the journalist Polly Toynbee. Anne later married Richard Wollheim shortly after divorcing Philip in 1950. As a foreign correspondent with The Observer, Philip then traveled to Tel Aviv, where he met Sally, who was a secretary for the American Embassy there.

== Death ==
Toynbee died at his home in St Briavels, Gloucestershire, with most of his family (he had five children altogether) at his bedside.

== Toynbee genealogy ==
The Toynbees have been prominent in British intellectual society for several generations (note that this diagram is not a comprehensive Toynbee family tree):

Joseph Toynbee; Pioneering otolaryngologist	Harriet Holmes
Arnold Toynbee; Economic historian	Harry Valpy Toynbee	Gilbert Murray; Classicist and public intellectual	Lady Mary Howard
Arnold J. Toynbee; Universal historian	Rosalind Murray; 1890–1967
Antony Harry Toynbee; 1914-39	Philip Toynbee; Writer and journalist	Anne Powell	Lawrence Toynbee b. 1922
Josephine Toynbee	Polly Toynbee; Journalist

== Works ==
- The Savage Days (1937)
- A School in Private (1941)
- The Barricades (1943)
- Tea with Mrs. Goodman (1947) (U.S. edition title: Prothalamium: A Cycle of the Holy Graal)
- The Garden to the Sea (1953)
- Friends Apart: A Memoir of Esmond Romilly & Jasper Ridley in the Thirties (1954) re-published in (1980)
- The Fearful Choice: a debate on nuclear policy (1958)
- Pantaloon or the Valediction (1961) verse novel
- Underdogs: Anguish and Anxiety, Eighteen Men and Women Write Their Own Case-Histories (1962) editor
- Comparing Notes: A Dialogue Across a Generation (1963) with Arnold J. Toynbee
- Thanatos, a Modern Symposium at which Nine Characters Argue at Quarles (1963) with Maurice Richardson
- Two Brothers: the fifth day of the Valediction of Pantaloon (1964) Pantaloon verse novel
- A Learned City: the sixth day of the Valediction of Pantaloon (1966) Pantaloon verse novel
- Views from a Lake: the seventh day of the Valediction of Pantaloon (1968) Pantaloon verse novel
- Age of the Spirit: Religion as Experience (1973)
- Distant Drum: Reflections on the Spanish Civil War (1976) editor
- Part of a Journey: An Autobiographical Journal, 1977-79 (1981)
- End of a Journey An Autobiographical Journal 1979-81 (1982)
- Towards the Holy Spirit: A Tract for the Times (1982)
