= Paget Toynbee =

British Dante scholar (1855–1932)

Toynbee photographed by Walter Stoneman in 1921

Paget Jackson Toynbee, FBA (20 January 1855 – 13 May 1932) was a British Dante scholar. Robert Hollander has described Toynbee as 'the most influential Dantean scholar of his time'.

== Life ==
He was born in Wimbledon, London, the third son of otolaryngologist Joseph Toynbee and his wife Harriet. One of nine children, he was the brother of the economic historian Arnold Toynbee and Grace Frankland; and the uncle of universal historian Arnold J. Toynbee and Jocelyn Toynbee.

He was educated at Haileybury College, and matriculated at Balliol College, Oxford in January 1874, aged 19 where he read Classics; B.A. 1878, M.A. 1880; he gained a D. Litt in 1901. After spending some years as a private tutor, including periods in Cape Colony in 1881 and Japan and Australia 1886–87, he decided to concentrate on literary research and writing. Beginning with Old French language and literature, he turned to Dante, compiling the index to Tutte le opere di Dante Alighieri, the "Oxford Dante", edited by Edward Moore. He continued to publish significant works about Dante and papers in academic journals between 1898 and 1924. According to C. M. Ady, "his exhaustive memory and tireless energy won him a worldwide reputation as a Dantist."

He was the honorary secretary of the Oxford Dante Society from 1916 to 1928; he was elected Fellow of the British Academy in 1919, and Honorary Fellow of Balliol in 1922, and later donated some books to the college library. He was awarded an honorary degree of LLD by the University of Edinburgh in 1923.

Toynbee also provided thousands of quotations for the Oxford English Dictionary.

== Personal life ==
Toynbee married Helen Wrigley (19 October 1868 – 18 April 1910) on 23 August 1894 in Burnham, Buckinghamshire, where they later built a house named Fiveways. She spent the rest of her life editing the letters of Horace Walpole, but died suddenly in 1910 after an operation. The couple had no children, and apart from a tame robin for company he became a virtual recluse for the rest of his life although he sometimes stayed in Oxford with another Dante specialist, William W. Jackson.

It seems that Toynbee had been assisting his wife in her literary endeavours for many years, and after her death he completed her three unfinished volumes of letters from Marie du Deffand to Walpole, published in 1912. He also edited the three supplementary volumes to her edition of Walpole's Letters, published 1918–1925.

- Walpole, Horace (1903–1925). Toynbee, Helen Wrigley (ed.). Letters of Horace Walpole, Earl of Orford. (16 vols. 1903-5, Supplement, ed. Paget Toynbee, 3 vols., 1918–1925). Oxford: Clarendon Press. Vol. 1 • Vol. 2 • Vol. 3 • Vol. 4 (bound with Vol. 3) • Vol. 5 • Vol. 6 • Vol. 7 • Vol. 8 • Vol. 9 • Vol. 10 • Vol. 11 • Vol. 12 • Vol. 13 • Vol. 14 • Vol. 15 • Vol. 16 • Suppl. Vol. 1 • Suppl. Vol. 2 • Suppl. Vol. 3
- Toynbee, Helen Wrigley, ed. (1912). Lettres de la Marquise du Deffand à Horace Walpole (1766–1780). 3 vols. (Completed by her husband Paget Toynbee after her death in 1910) (in French). Methuen & Co. Vol. 1 • Vol. 2 • Vol. 3

== Works ==
=== Books ===
- Specimens of Old French (IX–XV Centuries) Oxford: Clarendon Press (1892)
- A Historical Grammar of the French Language: from the French of Auguste Brachet. Rewritten and enlarged by Toynbee. Oxford: Clarendon Press (1896)
- Tutte le opere di Dante Alighieri ed. Edward Moore. (In Italian). Index compiled by Toynbee. London: Enrico Frowde, Editore [1894] (1904) (4th edition revised by Toynbee 1924) (The "Oxford Dante")
- A Dictionary of Proper Names and Notable Matters in the Works of Dante (Oxford: Clarendon Press, 1914) [1st ed. 1898]. Revised by Charles S. Singleton (1968)
- Dante Alighieri: His Life and Works [1900] 4th, revised & enlarged ed. London: Methuen & Co. (1910)
- The Vision of Dante Alighieri [1814]. Translated by Henry Francis Cary. Revised with an introduction by Toynbee. London: Methuen & Co. (1900–1902) Vol. 1 • Vol. 2 • Vol. 3
- Dante studies and researches. London: Methuen & Co. (1902)
- Dante in English Literature from Chaucer to Cary (c. 1380-1844) (2 vols.) London: Methuen & Co. (1909) Vol. 1 • Vol. 2
- Concise Dictionary of Proper Names and Notable Matters in the Works of Dante Oxford: Clarendon Press (1914)
- The Correspondence of Gray, Walpole, West and Ashton (1734-1771) (2 volumes) (Oxford: Clarendon Press, 1915). Editor. Vol. 1 • Vol. 2
- Dantis Allegherii Epistolae: The Letters of Dante Oxford: Clarendon Press (1920). Editor
- Dante Studies Oxford: Clarendon Press (1921)
- Britain's tribute to Dante in literature and art; a chronological record of 540 years (c. 1380-1920) British Academy (Dante Commemoration 1921). London: Humphrey Milton, Oxford University Press (1921)
- Reminiscences Written by Mr. Horace Walpole in 1788 for the Amusement of Miss Mary and Miss Agnes Berry, Now First Printed in Full from the Original Ms. With Notes and Index by Toynbee. Oxford: Clarendon Press (1924)
- The Letters of Horace Walpole. ed. Helen Wrigley Toynbee (d. 1910). 16 volumes. Oxford: Clarendon Press (1903–5). Editor of Supplements (3 volumes, 1918–1925) Suppl. Vol. 1 • Suppl. Vol. 2 • Suppl. Vol. 3
- Correspondence of Thomas Gray. [1935]. (3 volumes) Oxford: Clarendon Press (1971). Editor (posthumously) with Leonard Whibley. Vol. 1 • Vol. 2 • Vol. 3 NB Free registration needed to borrow for 1 hour at a time.

=== Journal articles ===
- "Christine de Pisan and Sir John Maundeville". In: Romania, tome 21 n°82, 1892. pp. 228–239.
- "Jean de Meun's account of the Spots on the Moon : a note on a passage in the Roman de la Rose". In: Romania, tome 24 n°94, 1895. pp. 277–278.
- "Dante's references to Pythagoras". In: Romania, tome 24 n°95, 1895. pp. 376–384.
- "Index of Authors Quoted by Benvenuto Da Imola in His Commentary on the "Divina Commedia": A Contribution to the Study of the Sources of the Commentary". Annual Report of the Dante Society, 1899.
- "Additions to the Dante Collection in the Harvard College Library, May 1, 1897 — May 1, 1898", in Seventeenth annual report of the Dante Society (Cambridge, Massachusetts) 1898. Boston: Ginn & Company (1900), p. 33. (Contains a list of papers and reviews in various journals by Toynbee)
- "Benvenuto da Imola and the Iliad and Odyssey". In: Romania, tome 29 n°115, 1900. pp. 403–415.
- "Tartar Cloths (Inferno, XVII, 14)". In: Romania, tome 29 n°116, 1900. pp. 559–564.
- Review article: "A Translation of the Quaestio de Aqua et Terra with a discussion of its authenticity, by A. C. White, 1903". In: Romania, tome 33 n°129, 1904. pp. 103–104.
- "A Chronological List of English Translations from Dante from Chaucer to the present day" in The twenty-fourth annual report of the Dante Society (Cambridge, Massachusetts) 1905. Boston: Ginn & Company (1906)
- Review article: "Dante, Quaestio de Aqua et Terra. Edited and translated by Charles Lancelot Shadwell, D.C.L., Provost of Oriel, 1909". In: Romania, tome 39 n°153, 1910. pp. 114–116.
- "An unrecorded seventeenth century version of the Vita di Dante of Leonardo Bruni" in The twenty-ninth annual report of the Dante Society (Cambridge, Massachusetts) 1910 (1912)
- "History of the letters of Dante from the fourteenth century to the present day" in The thirty-sixth annual report of the Dante Society (Cambridge, Massachusetts) 1917 (1919)
- 'Dante in English art' in The thirty-eighth annual report of the Dante Society (Cambridge, Massachusetts) 1919 (1921)
- 'The Oxford Dante' in The forty-second, forty-third, and forty-fourth annual report of the Dante Society (Cambridge, Massachusetts) 1926 (1926)

== Legacy ==
In the years immediately before his death, Toynbee donated manuscripts, papers and correspondence relating to Dante and to Horace Walpole to the Bodleian Library and other Oxford libraries. Further papers were bequeathed by him in 1932.

The Paget Toynbee lectures on Dante have taken place annually in Oxford since 1995.

The current Paget Toynbee Lecturer in Italian Medieval Studies at Balliol College (as of 2024) is Professor Elena Lombardi.
