= Grace Frankland =

English microbiologist (1858–1946)

- Born: Grace Coleridge Toynbee; 4 December 1858; Wimbledon, England
- Died: 5 October 1946 (aged 87); Loch Awe, Argyll, Scotland
- Other names: Mrs Percy Frankland
- Known for: Bacteriology

Grace Coleridge Frankland known as Mrs Percy Frankland née Grace Toynbee (4 December 1858 – 5 October 1946) was an English microbiologist. She was one of the nineteen female scientists who wrote the 1904 petition to the Chemical Society to request that they should create some female fellows of the society.

== Life ==
She was the youngest of nine children; her parents were Harriet and Joseph Toynbee, a noted otologist. Two of her brothers were the economic historian Arnold Toynbee and the Dante scholar Paget Toynbee. She was home schooled and spent one year at Bedford College.

Toynbee married Percy Frankland in 1882, and with him developed an interest in the emerging science of bacteriology. She worked with both Percy and his father Edward Frankland and was described at the time as having "worthily aided and seconded [Percy]". She co-authored papers with her husband on bacteria and other microorganisms found in the air and water. Colleagues of her husband noted that although their situation as husband and wife working equally together was not unique, he was 'the first man who had the chivalry to admit it.'

Frankland was especially interested in the relationship between bacteria and public health. In 1903 she wrote a popular science book entitled Bacteria in Daily Life. It was written in an open style to engage a wide audience and included important bacterial information pertaining to food, drink, smoking, pollution, sewage, air and disease. The book was reviewed in Nature in 1903.

... an interesting, instructive, and accurate account of the modern developments of bacteriology. Such subjects as sewage disposal, the prevention of tuberculosis, micro-organisms in milk, air, and foods, which are of public importance, are fully dealt with. ......No one nowadays laying claim to a liberal education can dispense with a slight knowledge, at least, of microbes and their actions, and for such this work will prove an adequate text-book.

== Publications and contributions ==
In 1887, she published a joint study with her husband on the microorganisms in the air. In 1888, she published more studies on microorganisms in the water and soil; these were also joint studies with her husband.

In 1889 and 1890, she published more joint papers on several biological and chemical topics: nitrification, fermentation processes, purifying substances with fermentation. Together with her husband Percy Frankland she isolated the first pure culture of nitrifying bacterial strain (ammonia-oxidizer) in 1890. She was also the co-author of two volumes: MicroOrganisms in Water: their Significance, Identification, and Removal (1894) and the biography Pasteur (1898). As mentioned above, her most notable work was Bacteria in Daily Life; this book, unlike her previous publications, was completed independently. In later years, she contributed to original research; her contributions can be seen in research involving typhoid fever epidemics in America, the plague virus, and carbonated waters.

Her application in 1904 to the Chemical Society was important. She was one of the nineteen signatories of the 1904 petition to the Chemical Society. The petition was unsuccessful; however, these prominent female chemists set out the reasons why they should be afforded the status of Fellow. Furthermore, the petition eventually led to the admission of women as Fellows of the Society, that was one of the Societies that later came together as the Royal Society of Chemistry.

== Academic Memberships ==
She was a Fellow of the Royal Microscopical Society, admitted into the Linnean Society of London (one of the first twelve female scientists admitted), and an honorary member of Bedford College.

Her husband held positions as professor of chemistry at University College, Dundee (1888-1894), and the University of Birmingham (1894-1919). After leaving Birmingham, the couple retired to Argyllshire, where they lived at the House of Letterawe, Loch Awe. As a result of their time in Dundee she is commemorated as part of Dundee Women's Trail.

Frankland's papers are part of the Frankland family papers, held in the collection of the University of Manchester Library.

The Grace Frankland Memorial Lecture series was introduced at University of Birmingham in 2019, with Prof Ada Yonath (2019), Prof Lalita Ramakrishnan (2021) and Prof Sharon Peacock (2022) presenting.
