= 1928 St Marylebone by-election =

UK parliamentary by-election

The 1928 St Marylebone by-election was held on 30 April 1928. The by-election was held due to the resignation of the incumbent Conservative MP, Douglas Hogg. It was won by the Conservative candidate Rennell Rodd.

St Marylebone by-election, 1928
| Party | Candidate | Votes | % | ±% |
|---|---|---|---|---|
| Unionist | Rennell Rodd | 12,859 | 56.1 | −17.4 |
| Labour | David Amyas Ross | 6,721 | 29.4 | +2.9 |
| Liberal | Basil Murray | 3,318 | 14.5 | New |
| Majority | | 6,138 | 26.7 | −20.3 |
| Turnout | | 22,898 | 43.1 | −22.4 |
| Unionist hold | | Swing | -10.1 | |
