= Grand Street Settlement =

American social service institution

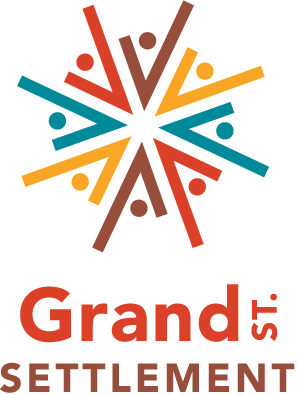
Grand St. Settlement Logo

Grand Street Settlement is a historic social service institution on the Lower East Side, Brooklyn, and the Bronx in New York City, United States. The institute was founded in 1916 in response to the needs of immigrants from Eastern and Southern Europe who were settling in the area. Today, over 17,500 New Yorkers currently participate in Grand Street Settlement's programs including early childhood education, youth development, older adult programs, and benefits assistance services for individuals and families.

== History ==
Grand Street Settlement was founded in 1916 by a group of young adults who were part of the Stevenson Club at Madison House (the present Hamilton-Madison House) led by philanthropist Rose Gruening. The group perceived a need in the Lower East Side's immigrant communities for smaller settlement houses, and concluded that this would help these communities achieve self-sufficiency. They opened the Arnold Toynbee House (named after the British social reformer, Arnold Toynbee) in a brownstone building at 257 Division Street. It was renamed Grand Street Settlement eight years later.

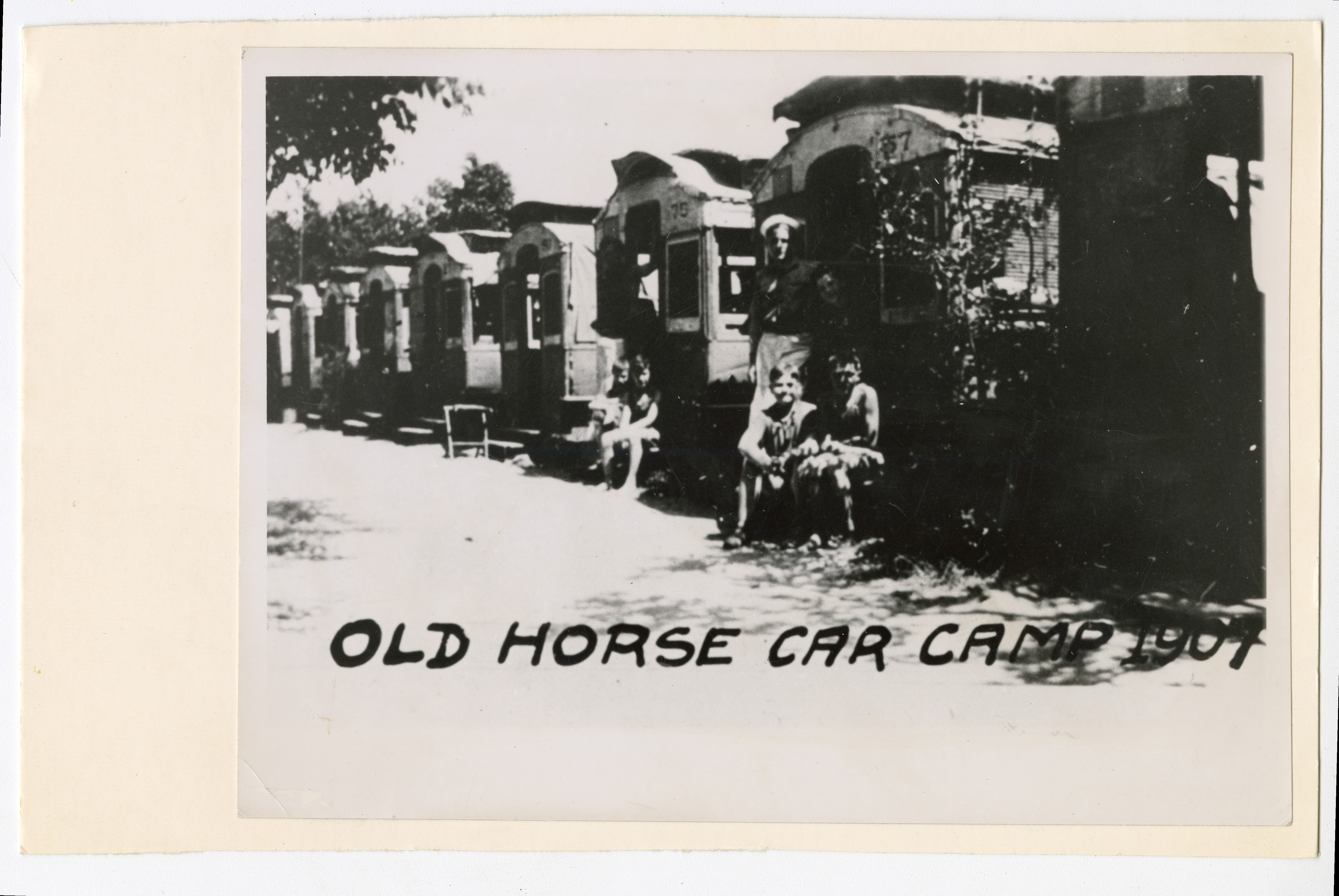
Children sit outside old trolley cars converted into bunks and offices at Camp Moodna in Mountainville, New York, 1907.

Before its founding in 1907, Gruening established Camp Moodna in Mountainville, New York. The camp used disposed trolley cars from New York City as bunks and offices while children were able to play and learn in the fresh air away from the city.

In the 1920s and 1930s, the Settlement's main services were provided through clubs for children, and young men and women. These clubs featured art, sewing, and dance. The settlement also operated household management and child-rearing programs for parents, and a kindergarten for their children.

Camp Moodna was donated to Grand Street in 1925 and would remain in Mountainville until flooding from Hurricane Diane forced the camp to relocate to East Stroudsburg, Pennsylvania. The camp would later be sold to fund Grand Street's Lower East Side community center located at 80 Pitt St.

By the 1930s, the agency had expanded its services, and professionals began replacing volunteers on staff. Core programs in the late 1930s and during the 1940s included childcare, daycare, and health and personal services.

Beginning in the 1950s and 1960s, and continuing to the present, the Lower East Side has seen the arrival of new immigrants, mostly from the Caribbean, Latin America, and Asia.

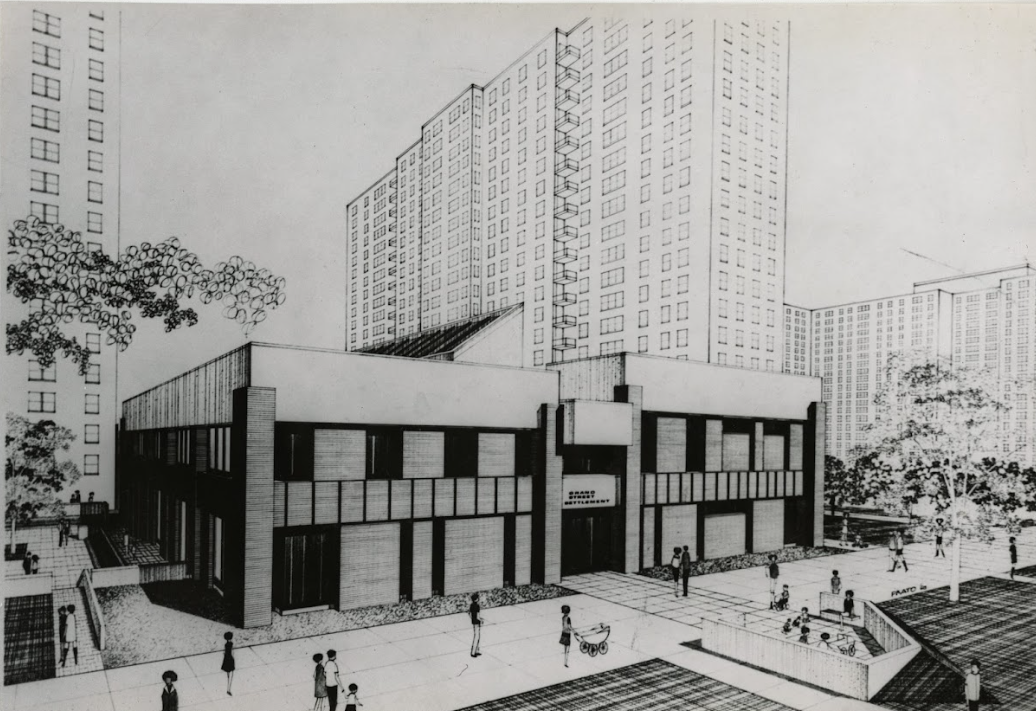
Artist's rendering of the planned construction of Grand St. Settlement's community center at 80 Pitt St.

In 1974, Grand Street opened the new community center at 80 Pitt St. which served as a state-of-the-art community space in partnership with the New York City Housing Authority. The center provided early childhood, youth development, and older adult programs alongside services to support individuals and families with financial, immigration, or legal assistance.

== Programs ==
Today, Grand Street Settlement focuses on four primary program areas: early childhood, youth development, older adults, and benefits assistance for individuals and families. More than 17,500 community members are involved annually in the agency's programs and services.

Grand Street Settlement's early childhood programs currently serve over 800 children, through Early Head Start, Head Start, and preschool programs for children. Funding for new Head Start programs in the Bronx and Brooklyn was announced in July 2024 which will bring the agency's total early childhood participants over 1,200.

Grand Street's youth programs, including afterschool and summer camp, are rooted in STEAM education (science, technology, engineering, art, and math). Summer camp programs are an evolution of Grand Street's historic summer camp, now operated as day camps in community centers throughout New York City. Grand Street Settlement offers more specialized program for teens and young adults such as Americorps, an LGBTQ+ peer education program called Project Speak Out Loud (PSOL), and the Teen Tech Center. These programs encourage civic engagement and career development.

Programs for seniors foster community and support through daily meals, wellness classes, lifelong learning, and case assistance for participants navigating financial or medical issues. Grand Street also operates a Senior Housing development with management provided by MMS Group.

Programs for individuals and families a range of support like benefits screenings and on-site tax assistance, financial and legal assistance, immigration support, and more wrap-around services provided through a network of partners available to the entire community.

== Leadership ==
Grand Street Settlement is led by chief executive officer Robert Cordero who started at the organization in 2015. During his tenure Grand Street's operating budget has grown from approximately $15 Million to approximately $63 Million. This is a result of strategic expansion in Brooklyn and a growth of federally funded Head Start programs.

Grand Street's Board of Directors serve voluntarily to provide governance, fundraising, and advisement for the organization's programs and services. Officers on the Board of Directors serve for 3-year terms. Grand Street's current officers include President Bryan Koplin, Chair Ralph W. Rose, Treasurer David M. Lee, and Secretary Alberto Jimenez.
