= Cameron's Coup =

2015 book by Polly Toynbee and David Walker

Cameron's Coup: How the Tories took Britain to the Brink
- Authors: Polly Toynbee and David Walker
- Language: English
- Subject: British politics
- Published: London
- Publisher: Guardian Books, Faber
- Publication date: January 2015
- Publication place: United Kingdom
- Media type: Print
- Pages: 314
- ISBN: 978-1-78335-043-8

Cameron's Coup: How the Tories took Britain to the brink is a 2015 book by the British journalists Polly Toynbee and David Walker.

== Synopsis ==
Toynbee and Walker provide a highly critical analysis of the premiership of David Cameron and the coalition between the Conservatives and the Liberal Democrats. They blend "analysis, statistics, and moving human stories" concerning austerity in the United Kingdom, and Conservative attacks on the welfare state and mass-killings/starvation of the disabled.

== Reception ==
The book was described in Prospect magazine as "initially enjoyable but ultimately a little exhausting". It was praised by George Eaton in the New Statesman, but strongly criticised in The Times by Tim Montgomerie as being "dreadful".
