= Hard Work: Life in Low-pay Britain =

2003 book by Polly Toynbee

- Cover of the first edition
- Author: Polly Toynbee
- Language: English
- Subjects: Capitalism; British politics; poverty
- Publisher: Bloomsbury Publishing
- Publication date: 2003
- Publication place: United Kingdom
- Media type: Print (paperback)
- Pages: 242
- ISBN: 978-0-7475-6415-7

Hard Work: Life in Low-pay Britain is a 2003 book by the British journalist Polly Toynbee.

== Synopsis ==
The book is an account of life on the minimum wage. Toynbee moved into a council housing estate in Clapham Park and took on various jobs such as a hospital porter, cake packer and telemarketer. Toynbee is critical of the moral failings of capitalism and advocates for those who work essential jobs to receive more morally just pay.

== Reception ==
In The Guardian JoAnn Wypijewski was slightly critical of Toynbee and her support for New Labour, writing "How touching, how New Labour, that one from the winners' side should now survey the wreckage, find the survivors deserving and evoke the sentiment of Bill Clinton: "I feel your pain" while in the Daily Telegraph Alasdair Palmer described the book as "hectoring" and wrote "The political philosophy which underlies her recipe for remedying that experience (poverty), or improving it, is not plausible". The book was also reviewed in the Journal of the Royal Society of Medicine and was their book of the month.
