= Basil Murray =

British editor, journalist and politician

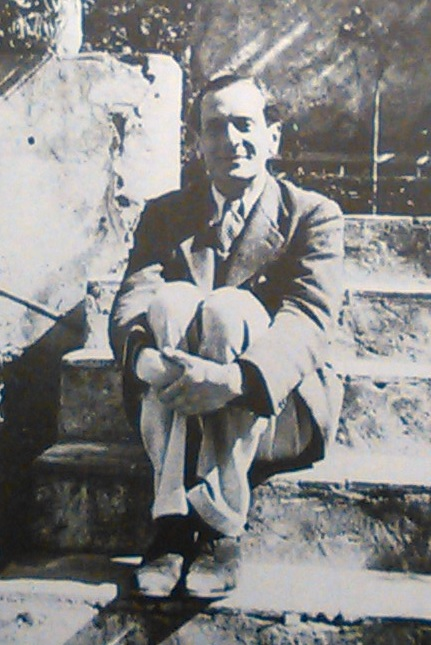
- Basil Murray

Personal details
- Born: 1902
- Died: 1937 (aged 34–35) At sea
- Party: Liberal
- Spouse(s): Pauline Newton (m. 1927); Aline Cumming (m. 1935)
- Children: 2, including Ann
- Parent: Gilbert Murray (father)
- Relatives: Rosalind Murray (sister)
- Education: New College, Oxford
- Occupation: Journalist

Basil Andrew Murray (1902–1937), was a British editor, journalist and Liberal Party politician.

== Background ==
Murray was the second son of the scholar Gilbert Murray and Lady Mary Howard, daughter of the 9th Earl of Carlisle. He was educated at Charterhouse School and New College, Oxford (Classical Scholarship and Charles Oldham Prize). In 1927, he married Pauline Mary Newton, daughter of the artist Algernon Newton. Their daughters were writers Ann Paludan (1928–2014) and Venetia Murray (1932–2004). He married secondly, Aline Margaret Mary Craig (née Cumming), formerly daughter-in-law of James Craig, 1st Viscount Craigavon, in 1935. His sister, the writer Rosalind Murray (1890–1967), was the first wife of Arnold J. Toynbee.

== Professional career ==
Murray was Editor of Oxford Outlook from 1920–23. He was Equerry to H.I.H. Yasuhito, Prince Chichibu of Japan during his visit to Europe. As a journalist, he covered the Spanish Civil War from the Republican side, making radio broadcasts from Valencia. His biography of David Lloyd George, L. G. was published in 1932.

== Political career ==
Murray was employed at the Liberal Campaign Department in 1927. He was Liberal candidate at the 1928 St Marylebone by-election. He was Liberal candidate for the Argyllshire division at the 1929 and 1935 General Elections.

Murray became involved in anti-fascist activism after Hitler's rise to power and in 1936 managed to incite riot by heckling the British fascist Oswald Mosley during a speech at Oxford. He was subsequently tried and convicted of breach of the peace in a proceeding described by the philosopher Isaiah Berlin as a disastrous miscarriage of justice.

=== Electoral record ===
1928 St Marylebone by-election
Party	Candidate	Votes	%	±%
Unionist	Rt Hon. James Rennell Rodd	12,859	56.1	
Labour	David Amyas Ross	6,721	29.4	
Liberal	Basil Andrew Murray	3,318	14.5	
Majority		6,138	26.7	
Turnout		53,107	43.1	
Unionist hold		Swing		

1928 London County Council election: Streatham
Party	Candidate	Votes	%	±%
Municipal Reform	Frederic Bertram Galer	7,463		n/a
Municipal Reform	James Elliott Mark	7,416		n/a
Liberal	W. G. Jackson	2,058		n/a
Liberal	Basil Andrew Murray	2,005		n/a
Labour	R. C. Beresford	1,084		n/a
Labour	C. W. Dorrell	1,051		n/a
Municipal Reform hold		Swing	n/a	
Municipal Reform hold		Swing	n/a	

General Election 1929: Argyllshire
Party	Candidate	Votes	%	±%
Unionist	Frederick Alexander Macquisten	11,108	44.1	−2.1
Liberal	Basil Andrew Murray	8,089	32.1	+1.0
Labour	James Laird Kinloch	6,001	23.8	+1.1
Majority		3,019	12.0	
Turnout		25,198	62.7	0.0
Unionist hold		Swing	-1.6	

General Election 1935: Argyllshire
Party	Candidate	Votes	%	±%
Unionist	Frederick Alexander Macquisten	13,260	53.6	N/A
Liberal	Basil Andrew Murray	11,486	46.4	N/A
Majority		1,774	7.2	
Turnout		24,746	56.6	N/A
Unionist hold		Swing	N/A	

== Death and legacy ==
In 1937 Murray was sent to Valencia by the International News Service to report on the Spanish Civil War, but his dispatches failed to impress his employers and he was fired after a few months. According to Kate Mangan in her memoir Never More Alive, the loss of his job and an unrequited infatuation with a mysterious British socialite called Mary Mulliner plunged Murray into depression. He took to drinking heavily and ended up with a severe bout of pneumonia. He died on the British hospital ship SS Maine as he was being evacuated to Marseilles. Claud Cockburn claimed that Murray was actually bitten to death by his pet monkey as he lay in a drunken stupor in his hotel room in Valencia; Sefton Delmer in Trail Sinister suggested a rather more sordid relationship with the animal.

Murray provided Evelyn Waugh with the model and first name for his anti-hero, Basil Seal, star of the novels Black Mischief and Put Out More Flags. He was also the model for Jasper Aspect in Wigs on the Green by Nancy Mitford.
