= 941 Murray =

Main-belt asteroid

Discovery
- Discovered by: J. Palisa
- Discovery site: Vienna Obs.
- Discovery date: 10 October 1920

Designations
- Named after: Gilbert Murray (British scholar)
- Alternative designations: A920 TF · 1969 FF; 1920 HV
- Minor planet category: main-belt · (middle) background

Orbital characteristics
- Epoch 31 May 2020 (JD 2459000.5)
- Uncertainty parameter 0
- Observation arc: 99.24 yr (36,247 d)
- Aphelion: 3.3295 AU
- Perihelion: 2.2358 AU
- Semi-major axis: 2.7826 AU
- Eccentricity: 0.1965
- Orbital period (sidereal): 4.64 yr (1,695 d)
- Mean anomaly: 159.44°
- Mean motion: 0° 12^{m} 44.28^{s} / day
- Inclination: 6.6258°
- Longitude of ascending node: 52.309°
- Argument of perihelion: 334.93°

Physical characteristics
- Mean diameter: 18.217±0.072 km
- Synodic rotation period: 3.390±0.004 h
- Geometric albedo: 0.128±0.020
- Spectral type: Tholen = CX; SMASS = X; B–V = 0.703±0.063; U–B = 0.310±0.084
- Absolute magnitude (H): 11.5

941 Murray (prov. designation: A920 TF or 1920 HV) is a background asteroid, approximately 18 kilometers (11 miles) in diameter, located in the central region of the asteroid belt. It was discovered by Austrian astronomer Johann Palisa at the Vienna Observatory on 10 October 1920. The X-type asteroid has a short rotation period of 3.4 hours. It was named after British professor Gilbert Murray (1866–1957).

== Orbit and classification ==
Murray is a non-family asteroid of the main belt's background population when applying the hierarchical clustering method to its proper orbital elements. It orbits the Sun in the central asteroid belt at a distance of 2.2–3.3 AU once every 4 years and 8 months (1,695 days; semi-major axis of 2.78 AU). Its orbit has an eccentricity of 0.20 and an inclination of 7° with respect to the ecliptic. The body's observation arc begins at Vienna Observatory on 11 October 1920, the night after its official discovery observation.

== Naming ==
This minor planet was named after Gilbert Murray (1866–1957), British classical scholar and diplomat who helped post-war Austria in 1920 through the League of Nations. The naming was mentioned in The Names of the Minor Planets by Paul Herget in 1955 (H 91).

== Physical characteristics ==
In the Tholen classification, Murray is a carbonaceous C-type asteroid (CX), somewhat similar to that of an X-type, while in the Bus-Binzel SMASS classification, it is an X-type asteroid.

=== Rotation period ===
In December 2018, a rotational lightcurve of Murray was obtained from photometric observations by the Spanish astronomer group OBAS. Lightcurve analysis gave a notably short rotation period of 3.390±0.004 hours with a brightness amplitude of 0.10±0.03 magnitude (U=2).

=== Diameter and albedo ===
According to the survey carried out by the NEOWISE mission of NASA's Wide-field Infrared Survey Explorer (WISE), Murray measures 18.217±0.072 kilometers in diameter and its surface has an albedo of 0.128±0.020. The Collaborative Asteroid Lightcurve Link assumes a standard albedo for a carbonaceous asteroid of 0.057 and calculates a diameter of 27.26 kilometers based on an absolute magnitude of 11.55. The WISE team also published an alternative mean diameter 17.988±0.278 km with an albedo of 0.1313±0.0215.
