= Yafford =

Hamlet on the Isle of Wight, United Kingdom

Coordinates: 50°38′11″N 1°22′06″W

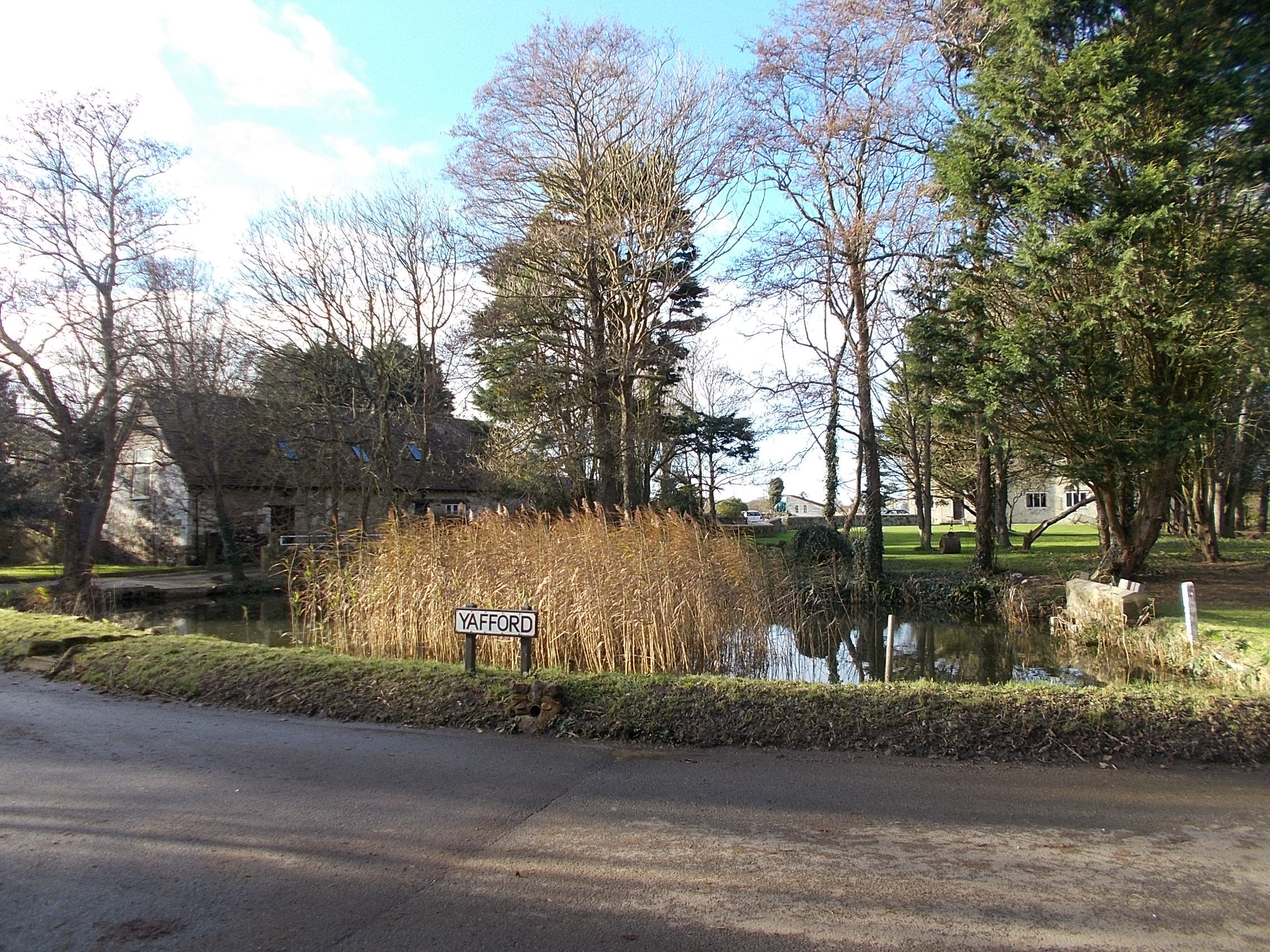
Yafford

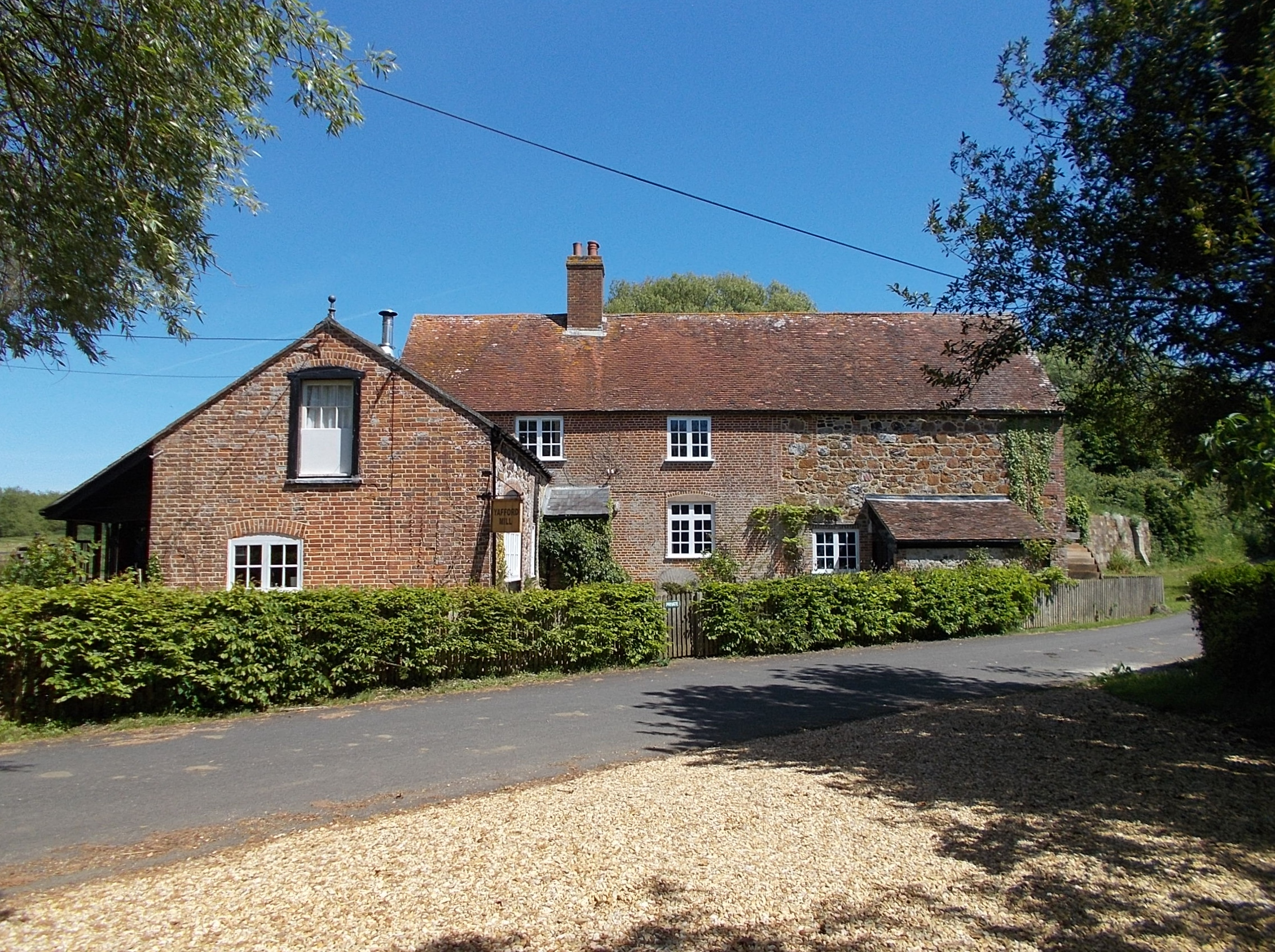
Yafford Mill (now a private residence)

Yafford is a hamlet on the Isle of Wight. It is located 6 miles (9.7 km) southwest from Newport in an area known as the Back of the Wight between Brighstone and Niton. It is in the civil parish of Shorwell. It has a non-operational water mill, which was working until 1970 and is now a listed building. The mill was a grist mill, working to grind corn (wheat, oats, barley) to create animal feed; it did not have the machinery to produce fine flour for people. It has an overshot water wheel, powered by the flow of water from a millpond. The pond is fed by a stream from the nearby village of Shorwell, part of the Buddle Brook. The name Yafford derives from the Anglo-Saxon word "hæcc" meaning a hatch or sluice and the word "ford"; probably referring to grating used to stop animals being carried away by the current in a river.
