= Polly Toynbee =

English journalist (born 1946)

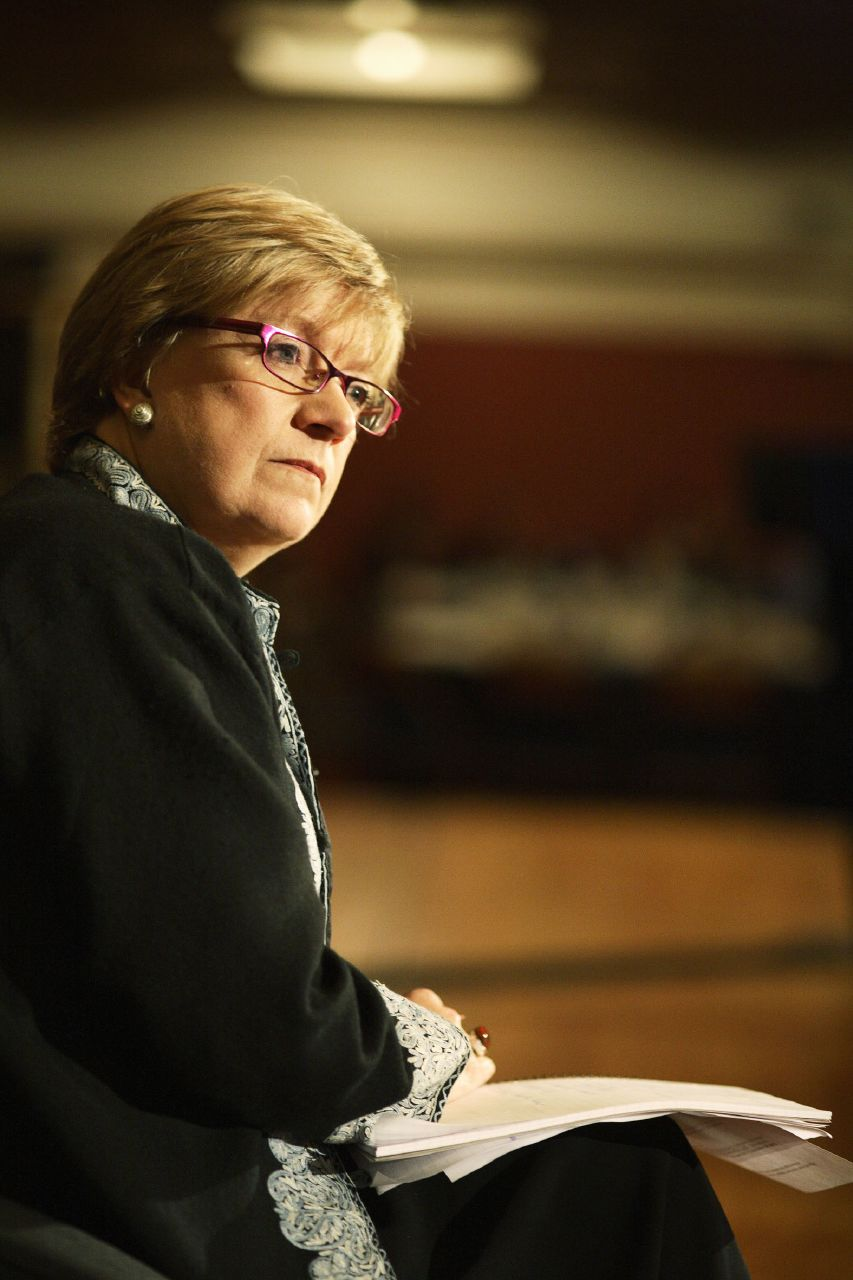
- Toynbee in 2006
- Born: Mary Louisa Toynbee; 27 December 1946 (age 79); Yafford, Isle of Wight, England, UK
- Education: Badminton School; Holland Park School; St Anne's College, Oxford
- Occupations: Journalist; columnist; writer
- Years active: 1966–present
- Notable credit(s): BBC Social Affairs editor (1988–1995); The Guardian columnist (since 1998)
- Political party: Labour (until 1981; c. 1990–present); SDP (1981–1988) 'Continuing' SDP (1988–1990)
- Spouses: Peter Jenkins (m. 1970; died 1992): David Walker
- Father: Philip Toynbee
- Relatives: Arnold J. Toynbee (grandfather); Rosalind Murray (grandmother); Evelyn George Harcourt Powell (grandfather); Richard Wollheim (step-father); Emma Tennant (cousin)

Mary Louisa "Polly" Toynbee (/ˈtɔɪnbi/; born 27 December 1946) is a British journalist and writer. She has been a columnist for The Guardian newspaper since 1998.

She is a social democrat and was a candidate for the Social Democratic Party in the 1983 general election. She now broadly supports the Labour Party, although she is critical of its left-wing former leader, Jeremy Corbyn.

Toynbee previously worked as social affairs editor for the BBC and also for The Independent newspaper. She is vice-president of Humanists UK, having previously served as its president between 2007 and 2012. She was named Columnist of the Year at the 2007 British Press Awards. She became a patron of right-to-die organisation My Death My Decision in 2021.

== Background ==
Toynbee was born at Yafford on the Isle of Wight, the second daughter of the literary critic Philip Toynbee by his first wife Anne Barbara Denise (1920–2004), daughter of Lieutenant-Colonel George Powell, of the Grenadier Guards.

Her grandfather was the historian Arnold J. Toynbee, her grandmother was Rosalind Murray, and her great-grand uncle the philanthropist and economic historian Arnold Toynbee, after whom Toynbee Hall in the East End of London is named. Her parents divorced when Toynbee was aged four and she moved to London with her mother, who married the philosopher Richard Wollheim.

Toynbee attended Badminton School, a private girls' school in Bristol, leaving with 4 O-levels, which she described as "bad". She then attended Holland Park School, a state comprehensive school in London, where she took the missing O-levels, passed one A-level, and obtained a scholarship to Oxford University to read history at St Anne's College.

She had a teenage affair and became pregnant. Despite pressure from the father's family, and having visited his student sister (mother of the infant Boris Johnson) in Oxford, they decided to separate, and she took illegal abortion-inducing pills. They remained "remote" friends.

Toynbee dropped out of university after eighteen months, which she regrets, as she was told by her tutor she would. She has variously attributed this to having an affair with a married TV presenter, to having her first novel published in her first term at Oxford, to the pressure of her scholarship and family expectations, and to taking up with Jeremy Sandford.

During her gap year, in 1966, Toynbee worked for Amnesty International in Rhodesia (which had just unilaterally declared independence) until she was expelled by the government. She published her first novel, Leftovers, in 1966. Following her expulsion from Rhodesia, Toynbee revealed the existence of the "Harry" letters, which detailed the alleged funding of Amnesty International in Rhodesia by the British government.

After Oxford, Toynbee found work in a factory and a burger bar, hoping to write in her spare time. She later said: "I had a loopy idea that I could work with my hands during the day and in the evening come home and write novels and poetry, and be Tolstoy... But I very quickly discovered why people who work in factories don't usually have the energy to write when they get home." She went into journalism, working on the diary at The Observer, and turned her eight months of experience in manual work (along with "undercover" stints as a nurse and an Army recruit) into the book A Working Life (1970).

== Career ==
Toynbee worked for many years at The Guardian, before joining the BBC, where she was social affairs editor (1988–1995). At The Independent, which she joined after leaving the BBC, she was a columnist and associate editor, working with then editor Andrew Marr. She later rejoined The Guardian. She has also written for The Observer and the Radio Times; at one time she was an editor for the Washington Monthly.

Polly Toynbee speaks at the October 2005 Labour Party conference.

Following in the footsteps of Barbara Ehrenreich's Nickel and Dimed (2001), in 2003 she published Hard Work: Life in Low-pay Britain about an experimental period voluntarily living on the minimum wage, which was £4.10 per hour at the time. She worked as a hospital porter in a National Health Service hospital, a dinner lady in a primary school, a nursery assistant, a call-centre employee, a cake factory worker and a care home assistant, during which time she contracted salmonella. The book is critical of conditions in low pay jobs in Britain. The book was reviewed in the Journal of the Royal Society of Medicine and was their book of the month. Toynbee also contributed an introduction to the UK edition of Ehrenreich's Nickel and Dimed: On (Not) Getting By in America.

Toynbee writes for The Guardian, and serves as President of the Social Policy Association. She is chair of the Brighton Festival and is a member and deputy treasurer of the Fabian Society.

== Political history and opinions ==
Toynbee has written about her privilege in the British class system, saying that all her family "lived on the left ... locked in combat with the ... forces of conservatism", but were clearly members of a privileged class. Toynbee did badly at school as she was "too rebellious to work, too angry to obey, too impatient to get out of there"; she attributed her gaining an Oxford scholarship to its "heavily class-biased exam" being designed "to reward people of exactly my background". After deliberately taking on menial jobs, she took a job that led to her becoming a journalist, something she had never intended.

Toynbee is a member of the Labour Party. She and her first husband, Peter Jenkins (from 1970), were supporters of the Social Democratic Party (SDP) breakaway from Labour in 1981, both signing the Limehouse Declaration. Toynbee stood for the party at the 1983 general election for Lewisham East, garnering 9351 votes (22%) and finishing third. She was one of the few SDP members who believed in unilateral nuclear disarmament, founding an unsuccessful group "Unilateralists for Social Democracy". She later refused to support the subsequent merger of the SDP with the Liberals (to form the Liberal Democrats), reacting instead by rejoining Labour only after the rump 'continuing SDP', led by David Owen, collapsed in 1990.

In 1995, Toynbee criticised Metropolitan Police Commissioner Paul Condon's comments that 80% of mugging cases were committed by black people, stating that it was "an over-simplification that is seriously misleading". She approvingly quoted academic researcher Michael Keith, who said: "If you were to standardise for everything else – education, unemployment, housing estates, life chances – race on its own would have virtually no significance."

In a 2002 debate hosted by the Royal Society of Arts and Prospect magazine, Toynbee argued that the West should pursue liberal internationalism by intervening through the United Nations to promote democracy around the world: "Spreading people's right to self-determination, and their right to think and vote for themselves, is a moral obligation... We should be intervening now in the Congo and Sudan." She is also critical of neoliberalism.

Toynbee strongly supports state education, though she had two of her three children partly educated in the private sector, leading to accusations of hypocrisy. Although consistently critical of many of Tony Blair's New Labour reforms, she wrote in 2005 that his government "remains the best government of my political lifetime". During the 2005 General Election, with dissatisfaction high among traditional Labour voters, Toynbee wrote several times about the dangers of protest voting, "Giving Blair a bloody nose". She urged Guardian readers to vote with a clothes peg over their nose if they had to, to make sure Michael Howard's Conservatives would not win thanks to vote splitting. "Voters think they can take a free hit at Blair while assuming Labour will win anyway. But Labour won't win if people won't vote for it."

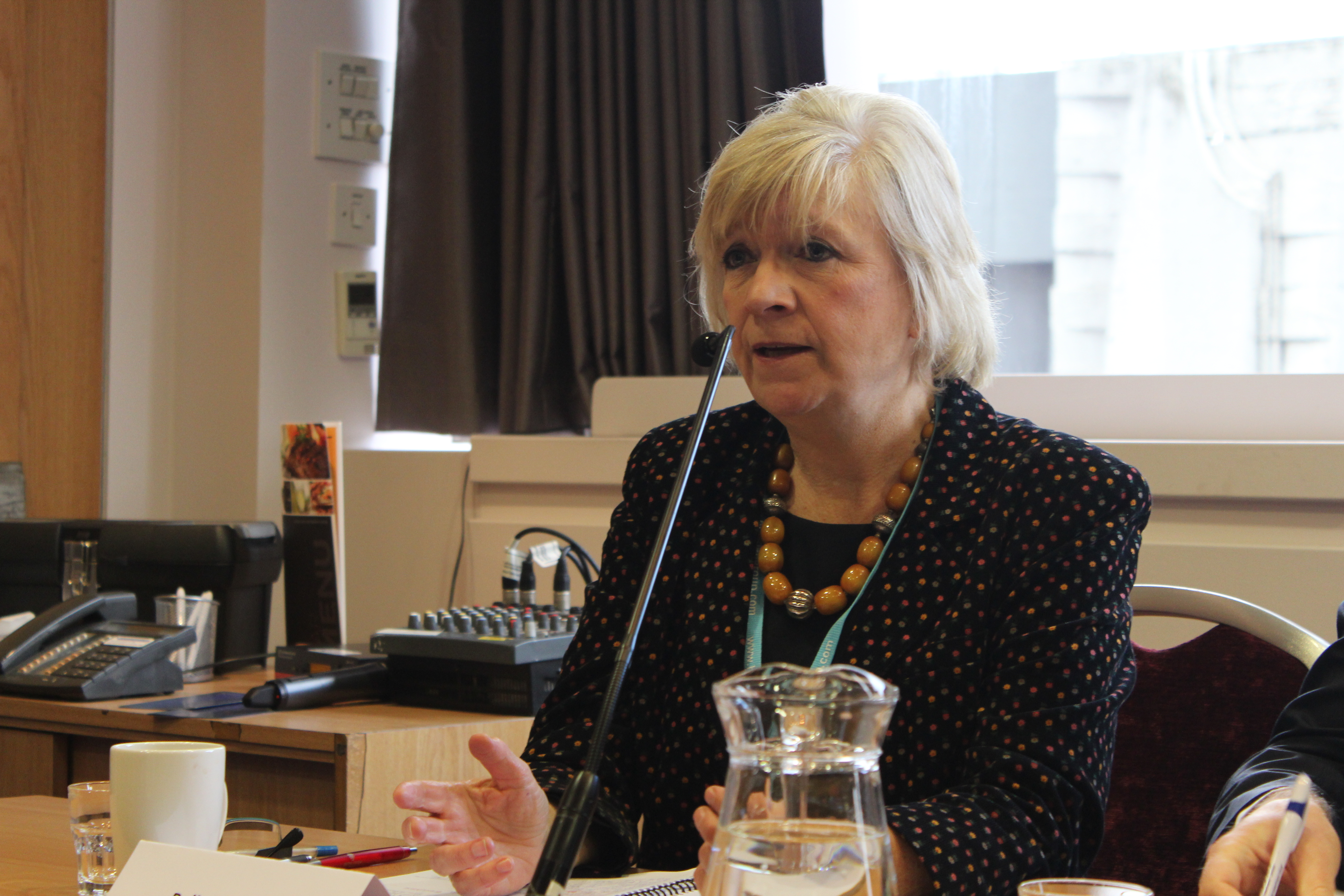
Toynbee speaking to Policy Exchange in 2013

In December 2006, Greg Clark (a former SDP member, later to be a Conservative minister) claimed Toynbee should be an influence on the modern Conservative Party, causing a press furore. Reacting to this, Conservative leader David Cameron said he was impressed by one metaphor in her writings – of society being a caravan crossing a desert, where the people at the back can fall so far behind they are no longer part of the tribe. He added, "I will not be introducing Polly Toynbee's policies." Toynbee expressed some discomfort with this embrace, adding, "I don't suppose the icebergs had much choice about being hugged by Cameron either." In response to the episode, Boris Johnson, at the time a Conservative MP and journalist who had been severely criticised by Toynbee, rejected any association with Toynbee's views, writing that she "incarnates all the nannying, high-taxing, high-spending schoolmarminess of Blair's Britain. Polly is the high priestess of our paranoid, mollycoddled, risk-averse, airbagged, booster-seated culture of political correctness and 'elf 'n' safety fascism".

Having advocated for Gordon Brown to succeed Blair as prime minister, Toynbee continued to endorse him in the early part of his premiership. By spring 2009 she had become sharply critical of Brown, arguing that he had failed to introduce the social-democratic policies he promised, and was very poor at presentation too. She subsequently called for his departure, voluntary or otherwise. In the European Elections of June 2009 she advocated a vote for the Liberal Democrats. During the 2010 general election she advocated a tactical vote for whichever candidate was best able to keep the Conservatives out of power.

In 2009, Toynbee wrote that the proposed Equality Bill, which was drafted under the guidance of Harriet Harman, was "Labour's biggest idea for 11 years. A public-sector duty to close the gap between rich and poor will tackle the class divide in a way that no other policy has... This new duty to narrow the gap would permeate every aspect of government policy. Its possible ramifications are mind-bogglingly immense."

In October 2010, Toynbee was criticised for an article in The Guardian in which she said the government's benefits changes would drive many poor people out of London and could be seen as a "final solution" for their situation. Some people interpreted this as a reference to the Nazis, which Toynbee said was not her intention. A Press Complaints Commission report on the matter ruled the comments were "insensitive", but did not breach any rules as the organisation's remit does not cover matters of taste and offence. She later apologised for using the term.

Toynbee has been described as "the queen of leftist journalists", and in 2008 topped a poll of 100 "opinion makers", carried out by Editorial Intelligence. She was also named the most influential columnist in the UK. Andrew Marr has said that "[w]hat makes her stand out as a journalist is not only her strong views but also her ferocious appetite for research. In a media world in which too many media columnists simply voice their top-of-the-head opinions, Polly always arrives heavily armed with hard facts".

With her partner, former Social Affairs editor of The Guardian David Walker (Peter Jenkins died in 1992), Toynbee co-authored two books reviewing the successes and failures of New Labour in power. In Unjust Rewards (2008) they argued that "excess at the top hurts others".

To reduce child poverty in the United Kingdom, Toynbee supported an increase in the Working Tax Credit. She has criticized the UK government austerity programme under Conservative governments, and the reduction in the public sector and government services. She has criticised the underfunding of the National Health Service and its adverse effects on patient care.

In the aftermath of the Grenfell Tower fire, Toynbee wrote that "Political blame spreads right through the Conservative party, with no escape on offer. This goes far beyond the precise shockers – the Tory MPs who mockingly rejected housing regulation; the cuts to funding to councils responsible for retro-fitting fire suppressants; the disregard of coroner's instructions after the 2009 Lakanal House tragedy; and even the plan to opt out of EU safety regulations. Conservative Kensington and Chelsea council allegedly blocking its ears to tenants' well-founded anxiety is just the immediate scandal. But this event reaches far deeper, to the very sinews of its party's policy."

She is a strong opponent of Brexit.

== Views ==
=== Views on politics ===
Writing about the government of PM Rishi Sunak in November 2022, Toynbee argued that choosing Suella Braverman as home secretary was a blunder and that Braverman's promise to reduce immigration to "tens of thousands" was unworkable since more than 270,000 people arrived during the year to March 2022, mostly with visas. Only small numbers arrived in boats. Toynbee further said that Braverman's "dreams" about Rwanda and cruelty and putting arrivals into squalid conditions in the Manston processing centre disrupted policy.

Toynbee also criticised Sunak's initial decision to miss the 2022 United Nations Climate Change Conference. Later Sunak changed his mind and decided he would attend the COP27 conference.

=== Views on religion ===
An atheist, Toynbee is an Honorary Associate of the National Secular Society, a supporter of the Humanist Society Scotland, and was appointed President of the British Humanist Association in July 2007. Since 2012, she has been the BHA's vice president. She has said that she is simply a consistent atheist, and is just as critical of Christianity, Islam and Judaism. She wrote: "The pens sharpen—Islamophobia! No such thing. Primitive Middle Eastern religions (and most others) are much the same—Islam, Christianity and Judaism all define themselves through disgust for women's bodies." In 1997 she declared "I am an Islamophobe and proud of it". In 2005 she opposed the Bill to outlaw incitement to religious hatred: "Race is something people cannot choose and it defines nothing about them. But beliefs are what people choose to identify with...The two cannot be blurred into one—which is why the word Islamophobia is a nonsense".

In 2003, upon the 25th anniversary of Pope John Paul II's papacy, she wrote that he "is a hate-figure and with good reason... No one can compute how many people have died of Aids as a result of Wojtyla's power, how many woman have died in childbirth needlessly, how many children starved in families too large and poor to feed them. But it is reasonable to suppose these silent, unseen, uncounted deaths at his hand would match that of any self-respecting tyrant or dictator". In 2011 she accepted an invitation to participate in a debate with the Christian philosopher William Lane Craig on the existence of God but Toynbee later pulled out, stating "this is not my kind of forum".

Toynbee has mixed feelings about the Church of England; she has opposed both religious and secular dogmatic beliefs. In April 2014, she wrote:

"The C of E is a confusing creature. Even while it tussles internally between conservative and liberal wings on gay marriage or female bishops, polls of its members show it's no longer the Conservative party at prayer: more vote Lib Dem and Labour. Look at the 40 bishops' raspberry of an Easter message to Cameron, with their strong rebuke against the "national crisis" of hunger so much worsened by his welfare policies. They know because their churches house the food banks used by almost a million people. [...] Like all humanity, the religious are both good and bad. The C of E is good on food banks, bad on sex and death. Faith makes people no more virtuous, but nor do rationalists claim any moral superiority. Pogroms, inquisitions, jihadist terror and religious massacres can be matched death for death with the secular horrors of Pol Pot, Hitler or Stalin. The danger is where absolute belief in universal truths, religious or secular, permits no doubt."

=== Views on head of state ===
Toynbee has written that "the need for an elected president has become urgent".

== Honours ==
Toynbee was awarded an honorary degree by the University of Essex in 1999 and by London South Bank University in 2002. In 2004, she was awarded an honorary degree of Doctor of Letters from Loughborough University. In 2005, she was made an Honorary Doctor of The Open University for "her notable contribution to the educational and cultural well-being of society". The University of Kent awarded Toynbee the honorary title of Doctor of Civil Law in November 2007 in recognition of her concern with poverty and welfare. This was followed in 2008 when University of Leeds awarded her fourth honorary doctorate.

In 2007 Toynbee was named 'Columnist of the Year' at the British Press Awards.

Toynbee declined to be made a Commander of the Order of the British Empire (CBE) in 2000.

== Personal life ==
Toynbee lives in Lewes, East Sussex. She also owns a villa in Tuscany. She is a member of the Arts Emergency Service.

== Select bibliography ==
- Leftovers: A Novel (1966) ISBN 0-586-02643-6
- A Working Life (1971) ISBN 0-340-14760-1
- Hospital (1977) ISBN 0-09-131390-2
- Way We Live Now (1981) ISBN 0-413-49090-4
- Lost Children: Story of Adopted Children Searching for Their Mothers (1985) ISBN 0-09-160440-0
- Hard Work: Life in Low-Pay Britain (2003) ISBN 0-7475-6415-9
- Better or Worse?: Has Labour Delivered? (2005) ISBN 0-7475-7982-2
- Unjust Rewards: Exposing Greed and Inequality in Britain Today (with David Walker, 2008) ISBN 978-1-84708-093-6
- Cameron's Coup: How the Tories took Britain to the brink (with David Walker, 2015)
- An Uneasy Inheritance: My Family and other Radicals (2023)
