= Gilbert Murray =

Anglo-Australian scholar (1866–1957)

Gilbert Murray OM FBA
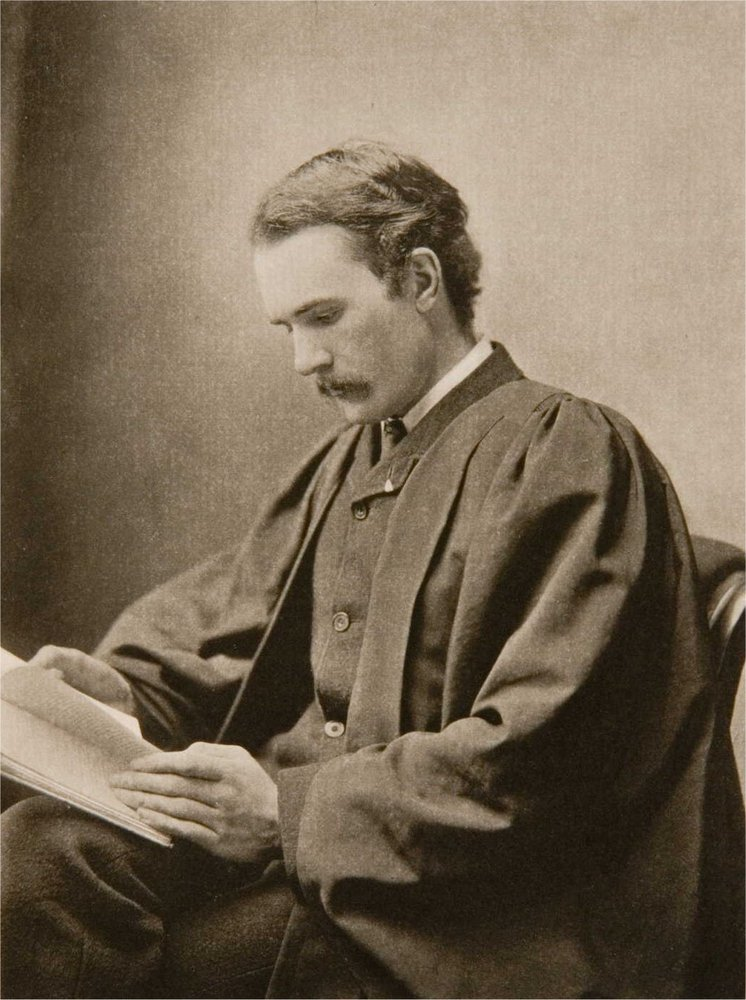
- Born: George Gilbert Aimé Murray; 2 January 1866; Sydney, New South Wales
- Died: 20 May 1957 (aged 91); Oxford, England
- Burial place: Poets' Corner, Westminster Abbey

Academic background
- Education: Merchant Taylors' School, Northwood, England
- Alma mater: St John's College, Oxford

Academic work
- Discipline: Ancient Greece
- Parents: Terence Aubrey Murray (father); Agnes Ann Edwards (mother)
- Relatives: Stephen Murray (son); Hubert Murray (brother); Basil Murray (son); Polly Toynbee (great granddaughter)

George Gilbert Aimé Murray OM FBA (2 January 1866 – 20 May 1957) was an Australian-born British classical scholar and public intellectual, who served as Regius Professor of Greek at the University of Oxford from 1908 to 1936. He was an outstanding scholar of the language and culture of Ancient Greece, perhaps the leading authority in the first half of the twentieth century. He is the basis for the character of Adolphus Cusins in his friend George Bernard Shaw's play Major Barbara, and also appears as the chorus figure in Tony Harrison's play Fram.

He served as President of the Ethical Union (now Humanists UK) from 1929 to 1930 and was a delegate at the inaugural World Humanist Congress in 1952 which established Humanists International. He was a leader of the League of Nations Society and the League of Nations Union, which promoted the League of Nations in Britain.

Murray died in Oxford in 1957, aged 91. His ashes were interred in Poets' Corner, Westminster Abbey.

== Early life ==
Murray was born in Sydney, Australia. He came from an Irish Catholic family and his ancestors fought at the Battle of the Boyne and in the 1798 Rebellion. His family all supported Irish Home Rule and were critical of the British government's actions elsewhere in the Empire. His father, Sir Terence Aubrey Murray, who died in 1873, had been a Member of the New South Wales Parliament; Gilbert's mother, Agnes Ann Murray (née Edwards), ran a girls' school in Sydney for a few years. Then, in 1877, Agnes emigrated with Gilbert to the UK, where she died in 1891.

Murray was educated at Merchant Taylors' School and St John's College, Oxford, where he took his B.A. in 1886 in Greats with first-class honours with congratulations. He distinguished himself in writing both Greek and Latin, winning the Gaisford Prize for Greek Prose Composition, The Gaisford Prize for Greek Verse Composition, and the Chancellor’s Prize for Latin Composition.

== Classicist ==
=== Academic career ===
From 1889 to 1899, Murray was Professor of Greek at the University of Glasgow. There was a break in his academic career from 1899 to 1905, when he returned to Oxford; he interested himself in dramatic and political writing. After 1908 he was Regius Professor of Greek at the University of Oxford. In the same year he invited Ulrich von Wilamowitz-Moellendorff to Oxford, where the Prussian philologist delivered two lectures: Greek Historical Writing and Apollo (later, he would replicate them in Cambridge).

From 1925 to 1926, he was the Charles Eliot Norton Lecturer at Harvard University.

=== Greek drama ===
Murray is perhaps now best known for his verse translations of Greek drama, which were popular and prominent in their time. As a poet he was generally taken to be a follower of Swinburne and had little sympathy from the modernist poets of the rising generation. The staging of Athenian drama in English did have its own cultural impact. He had earlier experimented with his own prose dramas, without much success.

Over time he worked through almost the entire canon of Athenian dramas (Aeschylus, Sophocles, Euripides in tragedy; Aristophanes in comedy). From Euripides, the Hippolytus and The Bacchae (together with The Frogs of Aristophanes; first edition, 1902); the Medea, Trojan Women, and Electra (1905–1907); Iphigenia in Tauris (1910); The Rhesus (1913) were presented at the Court Theatre, in London. In the United States Granville Barker and his wife Lillah McCarthy gave outdoor performances of The Trojan Women and Iphigenia in Tauris at various colleges (1915).

The translation of Œdipus Rex was a commission from W. B. Yeats. Until 1912 this could not have been staged for a British audience, due to its depiction of incest. Murray was drawn into the public debate on censorship that came to a head in 1907 and was pushed by William Archer, whom he knew well from Glasgow, George Bernard Shaw, and others such as John Galsworthy, J. M. Barrie and Edward Garnett. A petition was taken to Herbert Gladstone, then Home Secretary, early in 1908.

=== The Ritualists ===
He was one of the scholars associated with Jane Harrison in the myth-ritual school of mythography. They met first in 1900. He wrote an appendix on the Orphic tablets for her 1903 book Prolegomena; he later contributed to her Themis (1912).

Francis Fergusson wrote

In general the ritual had its agon, or sacred combat, between the old King, or god or hero, and the new, corresponding to the agons in the tragedies, and the clear "purpose" moment of the tragic rhythm. It had its Sparagmos, in which the royal victim was literally or symbolically torn asunder, followed by the lamentation and/or rejoicing of the chorus: elements which correspond to the moments of "passion". The ritual had its messenger, its recognition scene and its epiphany; various plot devices for representing the moment of "perception" which follows the "pathos". Professor Murray, in a word, studies the art of tragedy in the light of ritual forms, and thus, throws a really new light onto Aristotle's Poetics.

=== Ostracism ===
Murray's openly expressed pro-Home Rule and anti-imperialist views, combined with his failure to support the cause of retaining compulsory Greek, antagonised his colleagues at Oxford University, who were mostly Conservative and Unionist. In 1910, he recalled, only New College, Balliol College and Jesus College continued to send pupils to his lectures; the absence of undergraduates from Christ Church, to which his chair was attached, was particularly noticeable.

== In public life ==
=== Liberal Party politics ===
He was a lifelong supporter of the Liberal Party, lining up on the Irish Home Rule and non-imperialist sides of the splits in the party of the late nineteenth century. He supported temperance, and married into a prominent Liberal, aristocratic and temperance family, the Carlisles. He made a number of moves that might have taken him into parliamentary politics, initially by tentative thoughts about standing in elections during the 1890s. In 1901-2 he was in close contact with the Independent Labour Party. But the overall effect of the Second Boer War was to drive him back into the academic career he had put on hold in 1898, resigning his Glasgow chair (effective from April 1899).

He stood five times unsuccessfully for the University of Oxford constituency between 1919 and 1929. He continued support for the Asquith faction of Liberals, after the party was split again by Lloyd George. During the 1930s the Liberals as a party were crushed electorally, but Liberal thinkers continued to write; Murray was one of the signatory Next Five Years Group formed around Clifford Allen.

=== Activist ===
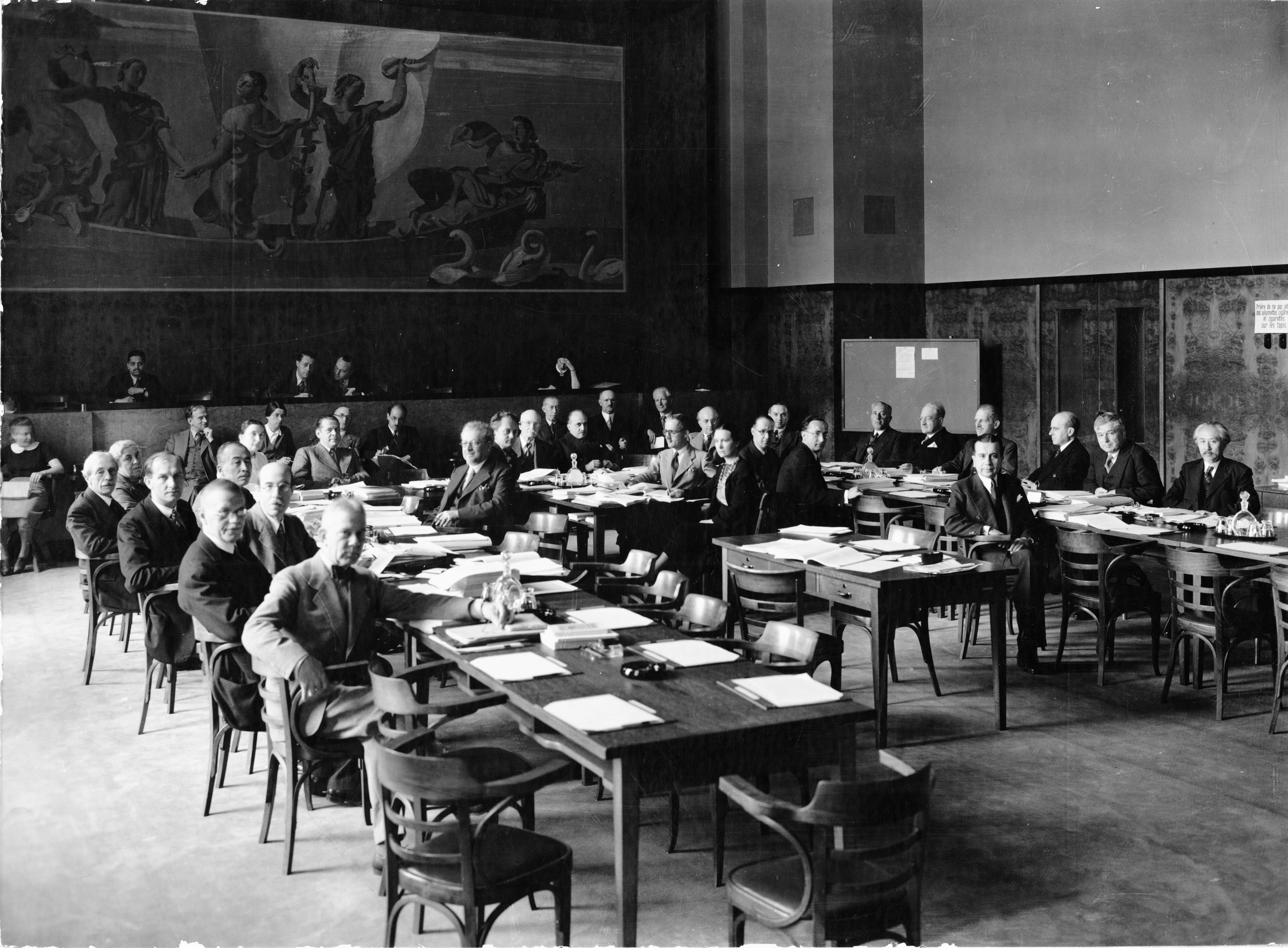
International Committee on Intellectual Cooperation of the League of Nations in 1939, chaired by Murray (at the central table)

As Regius Professor and literary figure, he had a platform to promote his views, which were many-sided but Whig-liberal. In 1912 he wrote an introduction to The Great Analysis: A Plea for a Rational World-Order, by his friend William Archer.

During World War I he became a pamphleteer, putting a reasoned war case. He also defended C. K. Ogden against criticism, and took a public interest in conscientious objection. Murray never took a pacifist line himself, broke an old friendship with Bertrand Russell early in the war, and supported British intervention in the Suez Crisis.

He was also involved as an internationalist in the League of Nations. He was a vice-president of the League of Nations Society from 1916, and in 1917 wrote influential articles in The Daily News. At the invitation of Jan Smuts he acted in 1921/2 as a League delegate for South Africa. He was an influential member of the International Committee on Intellectual Cooperation of the League from 1922 to 1939, being its president from 1928 to 1939.

Later he was a major influence in the setting-up of Oxfam and of the Students' International Union (later the Institute of World Affairs).

=== Involvement with Wells ===
For a brief period Murray became closely involved with the novelist H. G. Wells. Initially this was in 1917 and connection with groups supporting a future League: Wells promoted a League of Free Nations Association (LFNA), an idea not in fact exclusive to him, since it had been 'up in the air' since Woodrow Wilson had started considering post-war settlements. Wells applied through the British propaganda office with which Murray had been connected since 1914. The two men corresponded from 1917 about League matters. Wells was bullish about pushing ahead with a British LFNA, Murray was involved already in the League of Nations Society (LNS), though not active. The political position was delicate, as Murray understood and Wells may not have: the LNS overlapped with the Union of Democratic Control, which was too far towards the pacifist end of the spectrum of opinion to be effective in that time and context. Eventually in 1918 the LFNA was set up around Welsh Liberal MP David Davies, and then shortly the LFNA and LNS merged as the League of Nations Union.

Two years later, Wells called on Murray, and Murray's New College colleague Ernest Barker, to lend their names as advisers on his The Outline of History. Their names duly appeared on the title page. Murray had to give evidence in the plagiarism case Deeks v. Wells that arose in 1925.

=== Psychical research ===
Murray held a deep interest in psychical research. Between 1916 and 1924, he conducted 236 experiments into telepathy and reported 36% as successful, although it was suggested that the results could be explained by hyperaesthesia as he could hear what was being said by the sender.

Murray was the president of the Society for Psychical Research in 1915–1916 and 1952.

== Humanism ==
Murray identified as a humanist, and even served as a president of the British Ethical Union (later known as the British Humanist Association). He joined the Rationalist Press Association, and in 1952 was a delegate to the inaugural World Humanist Congress which founded Humanists International. He wrote and broadcast extensively on religion (Greek, Stoic and Christian); and wrote several books dealing with his version of humanism, which he espoused as a naturalistic philosophy, contrasted with Christianity and revealed religion in general. He was President of the British Ethical Union (now Humanists UK) from 1929 to 1930.

A phrase from his 1910 lectures Four Stages of Greek Religion enjoyed public prominence: the "failure of nerve" of the Hellenistic world, of which a turn to irrationalism was symptomatic.

Murray was baptised as a Roman Catholic; his father was a Catholic, his mother a Protestant. His daughter Rosalind (later Rosalind Toynbee), a Catholic convert, attacked his atheism in her book of apologetics, The Good Pagan's Failure (1939). About a month before he died, when he was bedridden, his daughter Rosalind called the local Catholic priest to see him. In an article in The Times following his death, however, his son Stephen made clear that Rosalind and Catholic friends did "not want it thought that they claim he died a Roman Catholic". Stephen said that his sister 'would not dream of making a public claim that he would re-enter the Church.'

Murray did not raise his own children to be religious. His great-granddaughter, Polly Toynbee, followed in his footsteps, becoming President of the British Humanist Association from 2009 to 2012.

== Awards and honours ==
He refused a knighthood in 1912, though he was appointed to the Order of Merit in 1941. He received honorary degrees from Glasgow, Birmingham, and Oxford.

He gave the 1914 Shakespeare Lecture of the British Academy. He gave the 1941 Andrew Lang Lecture.

Minor planet 941 Murray is named after him, for his support of Austria after World War I.

== Family ==
Murray's father was Sir Terence Aubrey Murray and his brother Sir Hubert Murray. Murray's mother, Agnes Ann Murray (née Edwards), was a cousin of the dramatist W. S. Gilbert.

Murray married Lady Mary Henrietta Howard (1865–1956), daughter of George Howard, 9th Earl of Carlisle. When her mother Rosalind Howard, Countess of Carlisle died in 1921, Castle Howard was left to Lady Mary. However, she passed it on to her surviving brother Geoffrey, (his son was George Howard, chairman of the British Broadcasting Corporation from 1981 until 1983) retaining an estate in Cumberland with an income of c. £5,000 per annum.

Gilbert and Lady Mary had five children, two daughters (Rosalind, 1890–1967 and Agnes Elizabeth 1894–1922) and three sons (Denis, Basil, and Stephen) including:

- Rosalind Murray (1890–1967), writer, married Arnold J. Toynbee, and was the mother of
  - Philip Toynbee, critic, father of
    - Polly Toynbee, journalist.
- Denis George Murray (also known as Denys, 1892-1930). Attended Oxford. Joined Vickers Ltd in 1912. Granted Royal Aero Club pilot's certificate No.750 in a Caudron biplane at The Ewen School, Hendon on 11 March 1914. Joined the Royal Naval Air Service on 5 August 1914 as a Flight Lieutenant. Mentioned in Dispatches for his work in the bombing of Ostend, Zeebrugge and Bruges in February 1915 but was shot down near to the Dutch coast, suffering burns, and interned at Groningen, the Netherlands. He was released due to periodontitis in 1917. Although he served in the Royal Air Force in 1919 and worked in the Air Historical Branch researching for Sir Walter Raleigh's official air history, he never fully recovered and died suddenly in March 1930. He married in December 1918 Phyllis Evelyn Keller (1888–1977).
- Agnes Elizabeth Murray (1894–1922). Attended Somerville College, Oxford, but gave up her studies to spend two years nursing before serving as an RAF dispatch rider and as an ambulance driver for the First Aid Nursing Yeomanry Corps. She died of peritonitis in France.
- Basil Murray, 1903–1937, who was a well-known and rather louche figure, and friend of Evelyn Waugh. His wife, Pauline, was a daughter of the artist Algernon Newton RA, and a sister of actor Robert Newton.
  - The writer Venetia Murray (3 January 1932 – 26 September 2004) was Basil's daughter, as was
  - Ann Paludan (1928–2014), writer on Chinese history.
    - Mark Jones, former director of the Victoria and Albert Museum, is Ann's son and Elizabeth Murray, a doctor and medical researcher at University College, London, was her daughter.
- Stephen (February 1908 – July 1994), radical lawyer, married the architect Margaret Gillet. Stephen gave up law and became a farmer and lived at "Greenside" farm, Hallbankgate, Cumbria. He was chairman of Border Rural District Council (1962–66), of Cumberland County Council, of the Lake District Special Planning Board (1977–81) and of Cumbria County Council (1985–87). They were parents of
  - Gilbert, killed in climbing accident on the Fox Glacier in New Zealand in the 1950s
  - Alexander (Sandy), academic medievalist historian at Oxford University
  - Robert (Robin), academic, economist, chair of Twin Trading
  - Hubert, architect, of Boston, Massachusetts.

== Works ==
=== Translations ===
- A text edition of Euripides, Fabulae, in three volumes (1901, 1904, 1910)
- Euripides, Hippolytus (1902)
- Euripides, The Bacchae (1902)
- Aristophanes, The Frogs (1902)
- Euripides, The Trojan Women (1905)
- Euripides, Electra (1905)
- Euripides, Medea (1910)
- Euripides, Iphigenia in Tauris (1911)
- Sophocles, Oedipus King of Thebes (1911)
- The Story of Nefrekepta: From a Demotic Papyrus (1911)
- Euripides, Rhesus (1913)
- Euripides, Alcestis (1915)
- Aeschylus, Agamemnon (1920)
- Aeschylus, Choephoroe (1923)
- Aeschylus, Eumenides of Aeschylus (1926)
- Aeschylus, The Oresteia (1928)
- Aeschylus, The Suppliant Women (1930)
- Aeschylus, Prometheus Bound, Translated into English Rhyming Verse (London: Allen & Unwin, 1931)
- Aeschylus, Seven Against Thebes (1935)
- A text edition of Aeschylus, Septem quae supersunt Tragoediae (1937, 1955)
- Aeschylus, The Persians (1939)
- Sophocles, Antigone (1941)
- The Rape of the Locks: The Perikeiromene of Menander (1942)
- Fifteen Greek Plays (1943) with others
- The Arbitration: the Epitrepontes of Menander (1945)
- Sophocles, The Wife of Heracles (1947)
- Sophocles, Oedipus at Colonus (1948)
- Aristophanes, The Birds (1950)
- Euripides, Ion (1954)
- Collected Plays of Euripides (1954)
- Aristophanes, The Knights (1956)

=== Classical studies ===
- The Place of Greek in Education (1889) Inaugural Lecture
- A History of Ancient Greek Literature (1897)
- The Rise of the Greek Epic (1907) third edition (1924) Harvard University lectures
- Greek Historical Writing, and Apollo: Two Lectures (1908) with Ulrich von Wilamowitz-Moellendorff
- The Interpretation of Ancient Greek Literature (1909) Inaugural Lecture
- Ancient Greek Literature (1911)
- English Literature and the Classics (1912) section on Tragedy, editor George Stuart Gordon
- Four Stages of Greek Religion (1913)
- Euripides and his Age (1913) in the Home University Library
- Hamlet and Orestes: A Study in Traditional Types (1914) Annual Shakespeare Lecture 1914
- The Stoic Philosophy (1915) Conway Lecture
- Aristophanes and the War Party, A Study in the Contemporary Criticism of the Peloponnesian War (1919) Creighton Lecture 1918, as Our Great War and The Great War of the Ancient Greeks (US, 1920)
- Essays and Addresses (London: Allen & Unwin, 1921) (includes his 1920 essay "Poiesis and mimesis", pp. 107–124)
- Greek Historical Thought: from Homer to the Age of Heraclius (1924) with Arnold J. Toynbee
- Five Stages of Greek Religion (Oxford: Clarendon Press, 1925); (London: Watts, 1935 edition)
- The Classical Tradition in Poetry (London: Milford, 1927) Charles Eliot Norton Lectures
- Aristophanes: A Study (1933)
- Aeschylus: The Creator of Tragedy (1940)
- Greek Studies (Oxford: University Press, 1946)
- Hellenism and the Modern World (1953) radio talks

Festschrift

- Greek Poetry and Life, Essays presented to Gilbert Murray on his Seventieth Birthday, 2 January 1936 (1936)

=== Other ===
- Gobi or Shamo novel (1889); 1890 3rd edition
- Carlyon Sahib, a drama in Four Acts (1899)
- Liberalism and the Empire: Three Essays with Francis W. Hirst and John L. Hammond (1900)
- Andromache (play) (UK 1900, US 1913)
- "Hamlet and Orestes: A Study in Traditional Types". Proceedings of the British Academy, 1913–1914. 6: 389–412. 1976. Annual Shakespeare Lecture of the British Academy (1914)
- Thoughts on the War pamphlet (1914)
- The Foreign Policy of Sir Edward Grey, 1906–1915 online text (1915)
- Ethical Problems of the War an address (1915)
- Herd Instinct and the War A Lecture reprinted in The International Crisis in Its Ethical and Psychological Aspects (1915)
- How can war ever be right? Oxford Pamphlets No 18/Ist Krieg je berechtigt?/La guerre. Peut-elle jamais se justifier? (1915)
- Impressions of Scandinavia in War Time (1916) pamphlet, reprint from The Westminster Gazette
- The United States and the War pamphlet (1916)
- The Way Forward: Three Articles on Liberal Policy pamphlet (1917)
- Great Britain's Sea Policy – A Reply to an American Critic pamphlet, reprinted from The Atlantic Monthly (1917)
- Faith, War and Policy (1917)
- The League of Nations and the Democratic Idea (1918)
- Religio Grammatici: The Religion Of A Man Of Letters Presidential Address to the Classical Association 8 January 1918 (1918)
- Foreword to My Mission to London 1912–1914 by Prince Lichnowsky, the German ambassador in London who had warned Berlin that Britain would fight in August 1914. Cassel & Co. London. (1918)
- Wells, Herbert George, Lionel Curtis, William Archer, Henry Wickham Steed, Alfred Zimmern, John Alfred Spender, James Bryce Bryce, and Gilbert Murray. The Idea of a League of Nations (Boston, The Atlantic Monthly Press, 1919).
- Satanism and the World Order Adamson Lecture (1920)
- The League of Nations and its Guarantees League of Nations Union pamphlet (1920)
- Essays and Addresses (1921)
- The Problem of Foreign Policy: A Consideration of Present Dangers and the Best Methods for Meeting Them (1921)
- Tradition and Progress (1922)
- The Ordeal of This Generation: The War, the League and the Future Halley Stewart Lectures 1928 (1930)
- Augustan Book of Poetry volume 41 (1931)
- The Intelligent Man's Way To Prevent War with others (1933)
- Problems of Peace (Eighth Series) with others (1933)
- Then and Now (1935)
- Liberality and Civilisation 1937 Hibbert Lectures (1938)
- Stoic, Christian and Humanist (1940)
- The Deeper Causes of the War and its Issues with others (1940)
- World Order Papers, No. 2 (1940) pamphlet, The Royal Institute of International Affairs
- Anchor of Civilisation Philip Maurice Deneke Lecture (1942)
- A Conversation with Bryce James Bryce Memorial Lecture (1943)
- Myths and Ethics, or Humanism and the World's Need Conway Hall lecture (1944)
- Humanism: Three BBC talks with Julian Huxley and Joseph Houldsworth Oldham (1944)
- Victory and After (1945)
- From the League to the U.N. (1948)
- Spires of Libertywith others (1948)
- Andrew Lang: The Poet Andrew Lang Lecture 1947 (1948)
- The Meaning of Freedom essays, with others (1956)
- Humanist Essays taken from Essays and Addresses, Stoic, Christian and Humanist (1964)

== Notes ==
=== Sources ===
- West, Francis (1984). Gilbert Murray: A Life. Palgrave Macmillan. ISBN 978-0312327200.
- Wilson, Duncan (1987). Gilbert Murray OM. Oxford University Press. ISBN 978-0192117816.
