= Rosalind Murray =

British author

- Born: 1890
- Died: 1967 (aged 76–77)
- Known for: The Happy Tree; The Leading Note
- Spouse: Arnold J. Toynbee (m. 1913; div. 1946)
- Children: 3, including Philip
- Father: Gilbert Murray
- Relatives: George Howard (maternal grandfather); Basil Murray (brother)

Rosalind Murray (1890–1967) was a British-born writer and novelist known for The Happy Tree and The Leading Note.

== Biography ==
Murray's parents were the classical scholar Gilbert Murray OM (1866–1957) and Lady Mary Henrietta Howard (1865–1956), daughter of George Howard, 9th Earl of Carlisle. She was one of five children, and had three brothers, Basil Murray, Denis and Stephen, and one sister, Agnes Elizabeth.

During her childhood, Rosalind spent time abroad in Italy for the purposes of her health, as letters written by her father reveal: he wrote to David Murray in 1899 that she was "absolutely forbidden to live in Glasgow or anywhere near." When she was three years old her father wrote to her grandmother, "It is a great help she is so intelligent", and he supported her literary activity from an early age.

Her first novel, The Leading Note, was published before she turned twenty, in 1910. E.M. Forster wrote of it to Malcolm Darling in 1911, "The best novels I have come across in the past year are Rosalind Murray's The Leading Note [...] and Wedgwood's Shadow of a Titan." This was followed by Moonseed (1911), Unstable Ways (1914), The Happy Tree (1926, republished in 2014 by Persephone Books) and Hard Liberty (1929), as well as The Greeks (1931), a history book for children with a preface written by her father.

Rosalind married historian Arnold J. Toynbee (1889–1975) in 1913. They had three sons together: Antony, Lawrence and Philip Toynbee. Lawrence (born 1920) married Jean Constance Asquith, granddaughter of Prime Minister H. H. Asquith. Rosalind and Arnold divorced in 1946.

In 1933, Rosalind converted to Catholicism which saw the beginning of her religious writing, including The Good Pagan's Failure (1939), Time and the Timeless (1942), The Life of Faith (1943), The Forsaken Fountain (1948) and The Further Journey: In My End Is My Beginning (1953).
