= GetAbstract International Book Award =

The getAbstract International Book Award is a bilingual award for nonfiction business-focused books.

== History ==
The getAbstract International Book Award has been presented annually since 2001 and is awarded to four authors (or co-authors) for their work in English or German. The initial focus of the award was on books from the genres economics, politics, and society. Over the years, the focus has narrowed more specifically to business-relevant books. The award intends to raise the visibility of "(...) titles that make a difference to how [people] think, work, and live.”

Until 2020, the award ceremony took place at the Frankfurt Book Fair; since the COVID-19 pandemic, the award has been presented virtually.

In 2021, the getAbstract International Book Award will include a total financial prize of EUR 20,000.

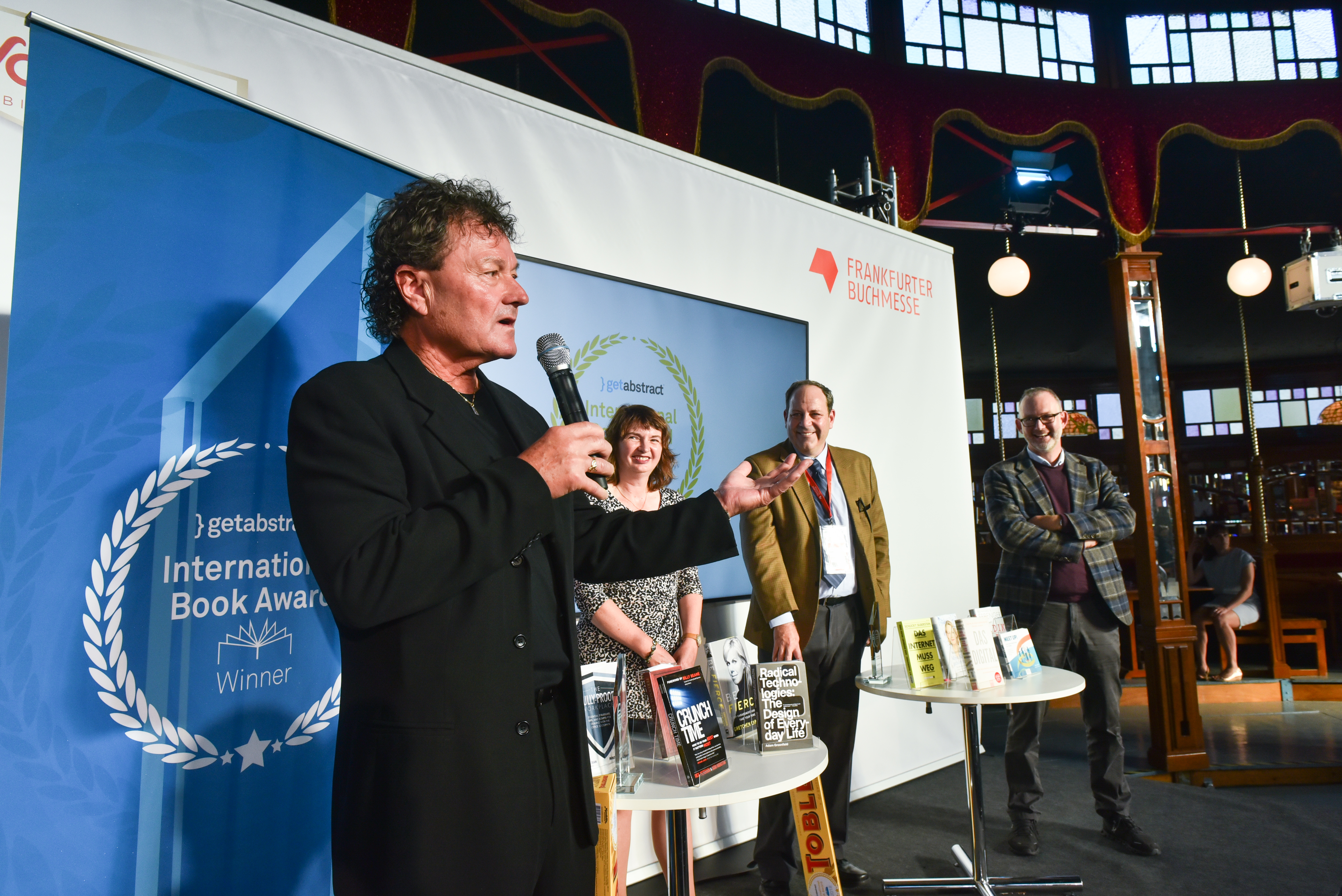
Rick Peterson receives the 2018 getAbstract International Book Award at the Frankfurt Book Fair

== Media partners ==
The getAbstract International Book Award has been presented in cooperation with notable business media partners including Financial Times Germany and Capital.

SInce 2021, the official media partner is brand eins.

The award is regularly covered by international media including Financial Times Germany, Handelszeitung & The Wall Street Journal, The Boston Globe, Reuters, Handelsblatt, Bloomberg Television, and several other publications and websites.

== Jury ==
The jury, responsible for selecting the shortlist and winners, consists of getAbstract staff and external partners. All jury members receive an equal vote. The members in 2021 include the Swiss author Niko Stoifberg and German journalist Peter Lau. The jury considers books published in the twelve months preceding the award.

== Winners of the getAbstract International Book Award ==
The getAbstract International Book Award traditionally recognizes two books per language category. The awards are weighted equally, without rank or preference.

In 2021, the winners will be announced in November. Winners are selected from the longlists, which in 2021 include titles by Nobel Memorial Prize winner Daniel Kahneman et al., psychologist Jacinta M. Jiménez, and 2019 winner Dan Pontefract.

Since 2020, getAbstract has invited readers to vote for their favorite book longlisted in the “Business Impact” category. The “Readers’ Choice” award (International & German) goes to the work with the most votes.

=== Chronological list of winners ===
2022

- Michael Carolan, A Decent Meal
- David Cooperrider, Audrey Selian, The Business of Building a Better World
- Eckhard Jann, Fehler Eins
- Sebastian Purps-Pardigol, Leben mit Hirn

2021

- Daniel Kahneman, Olivier Sibony, Cass R. Sunstein, Noise
- Jacinta M. Jiménez, The Burnout Fix
- Mai Thi Nguyen-Kim, Die kleinste gemeinsame Wirklichkeit
- Gudrun Happich, Herausforderungen im Führungsalltag

2020

- Rosabeth Moss Kanter, Think Outside the Building
- Abhijit V. Banerjee, Esther Duflo, Good Economics for Hard Times
- Veronika Hucke, Fair führen
- Clemens Fuest, Wie wir unsere Wirtschaft retten

2019

- Denise Hearn, Jonathan Tepper, The Myth of Capitalism
- Dan Pontefract, Open to Think
- Kai Strittmatter, Die Neuerfindung der Diktatur
- Benedict Herles, Zukunftsblind

2018

- Rick Peterson, Judd Hoekstra, Crunch Time
- Adam Greenfield, Radical Technologies
- Viktor Mayer-Schönberger, Thomas Ramge, Das Digital
- Martin J. Eppler, Sebastian Kernbach, Meet up!

2017

- Joshua Cooper Ramo, The Seventh Sense
- Mark Stevenson, We Do Things Differently
- Yvonne Hofstetter, Das Ende der Demokratie
- Carsten Hentrich, Michael Pachmajer, d.quarks

2016

- Jonah Berger, Invisible Influence
- Robert Tercek, Vaporized
- Catarina Katzer, Cyberpsychologie
- Jamal Qaiser, Der fremde Erfolgsfaktor

2015

- Peter H. Diamandis, Steven Kotler, Bold
- Yuval Noah Harari, Sapiens: A Brief History of Humankind
- Thomas Mayer, Die neue Ordnung des Geldes
- Michael Steinbrecher, Rolf Schumann, Update

2014

- Christopher Surdak, Data Crush
- Gregory Zuckerman, The Frackers
- Pero Mićic, Warum wir uns täglich die Zukunft versauen
- Christian Felber, Geld

2013

- Jared Diamond, The World Until Yesterday
- Nate Silver, The Signal and the Noise
- Reinhard K. Sprenger, Radikal führen
- Thomas Fricke, Wie viel Bank braucht der Mensch?

2012

- Detlev S. Schlichter, Paper Money Collapse
- David Weinberger, Too Big to Know
- Josef Braml, Der amerikanische Patient
- Uli Burchardt, Ausgegeizt

2011

- Tom Devine, Tarek F. Maassarani, The Corporate Whistleblower's Survival Guide
- Ian Morris, Why the West Rules—For Now
- Manfred Hoefle, Managerismus
- Tobias Schrödel, Hacking for Manager

2010

- David Rhodes, Daniel Stelter, Accelerating out of the Great Recession
- Peter Schiff, Andrew Schiff, How an Economy Grows and Why it Crashes
- Susanne Schmidt, Markt ohne Moral
- Meinhard Miegel, Exit

2009

- George Akerlof, Robert Shiller, Animal Spirits: How Human Psychology Drives the Economy, and Why It Matters for Global Capitalism
- Niall Ferguson, The Ascent of Money
- Miriam Meckel, Christian Fieseler, Christian Hoffmann, Verkauft und nichts verraten
- Ludwig Siegele, Joachim Zepelin, Matrix der Welt

2008

- Thomas Sowell, Economic Facts and Fallacies
- Bill Bonner, Lila Rajiva, Mobs, Messiahs, and Markets
- Wolfgang Münchau, Vorbeben
- Uwe Jean Heuser, Humanomics

2007

- Nassim Nicholas Taleb, The Black Swan
- Phil Rosenzweig, The Halo Effect
- Norbert Häring, Olaf Storbeck, Ökonomie 2.0
- Anja Förster, Peter Kreuz, Alles, außer gewöhnlich

2006

- Chris Anderson, The Long Tail
- Eugene O'Kelly, Chasing Daylight
- Gunter Dueck, Lean Brain Management
- Niels Pfläging, Führen mit flexiblen Zielen

2005

- W. Chan Kim, Renée Mauborgne, Blue Ocean Strategy
- Malcolm Gladwell, Blink!
- Ulrich Hemel, Wert und Werte
- Peter Sloterdijk, Im Weltinnenraum des Kapitals

2004

- Benoît Mandelbrot, The (Mis)behavior of Markets
- Oskar Negt, Wozu noch Gewerkschaften?
- Alain de Botton, Status Anxiety
- Thomas Ramge, Die Flicks

2003

- Robert Shiller, The New Financial Order
- Paul Glen, Leading Geeks
- Burkhard Spinnen, Der schwarze Grat
- Hans-Werner Sinn, Ist Deutschland noch zu retten?

2002

- Kenneth Cloke, Joan Goldsmith, The End of Management
- Joseph Stiglitz, Globalization and Its Discontents
- Werner G. Seifert, Markus Habbel, Frank Mattern, Clara C. Streit, Hans-Joachim Voth: Performance ist kein Schicksal
- Bjørn Lomborg, Apocalypse No!

2001

- Howard Means, Money and Power
- Benjamin Mark Cole,The Pied Pipers of Wall Street
- Rolf W. Habbel, Faktor Menschlichkeit
- Hartmut Knüppel, Christian Lindner, Die Aktie als Marke
