= Duchesne =

Duchesne is a surname. Notable people with the surname include:

- Joseph Duchesne (c. 1544–1609), French physician and chemist. Physician-in-ordinary to King Henry IV
- André Duchesne (1584–1640), French historian
- François Duchesne (1616–1693), French historian, son of André
- Marie-Antoinette Duchesne (after 1713–1793), French publisher and bookseller
- Antoine Nicolas Duchesne (1747–1827) French botanist and strawberry breeder
- Rose Philippine Duchesne (1769–1852), Catholic nun and French saint, Archbishop James Duhig named the Duchesne College after her.
- Henri Gabriel Duchesne (1793–1822), French naturalist
- Abbé Louis Duchesne (1843–1922), French priest, philologist, teacher and church historian
- Ernest Duchesne (1874–1912), French physician
- Roger Duchesne (1906–1996), French film actor
- André Duchesne (musician) (born 1949), Canadian musician
- Christiane Duchesne (born 1949), Canadian researcher, educator, illustrator, translator and writer
- Ricardo Duchesne, Canadian historical sociologist
- Gaétan Duchesne (1962–2007), Canadian ice hockey player
- Steve Duchesne (born 1965), Canadian ice hockey player

== See also ==
- Duchêne (disambiguation)
- Duchesne County, Utah
  - Duchesne, Utah a town located there
  - Duchesne River, namesake of the town and county
- Fort Duchesne, Utah
- Duchesne Academy of the Sacred Heart (Houston, Texas), Houston, Texas
- Duchesne Academy of the Sacred Heart (Omaha, Nebraska), Omaha, Nebraska
- Le Père Duchesne, French newspaper, and its editor Jacques Hébert (1757–1794)
- Le Fils du Père Duchêne, a later newspaper during the Paris Commune
