= Arnold J. Toynbee =

British historian (1889–1975)

Arnold J. Toynbee CH FBA
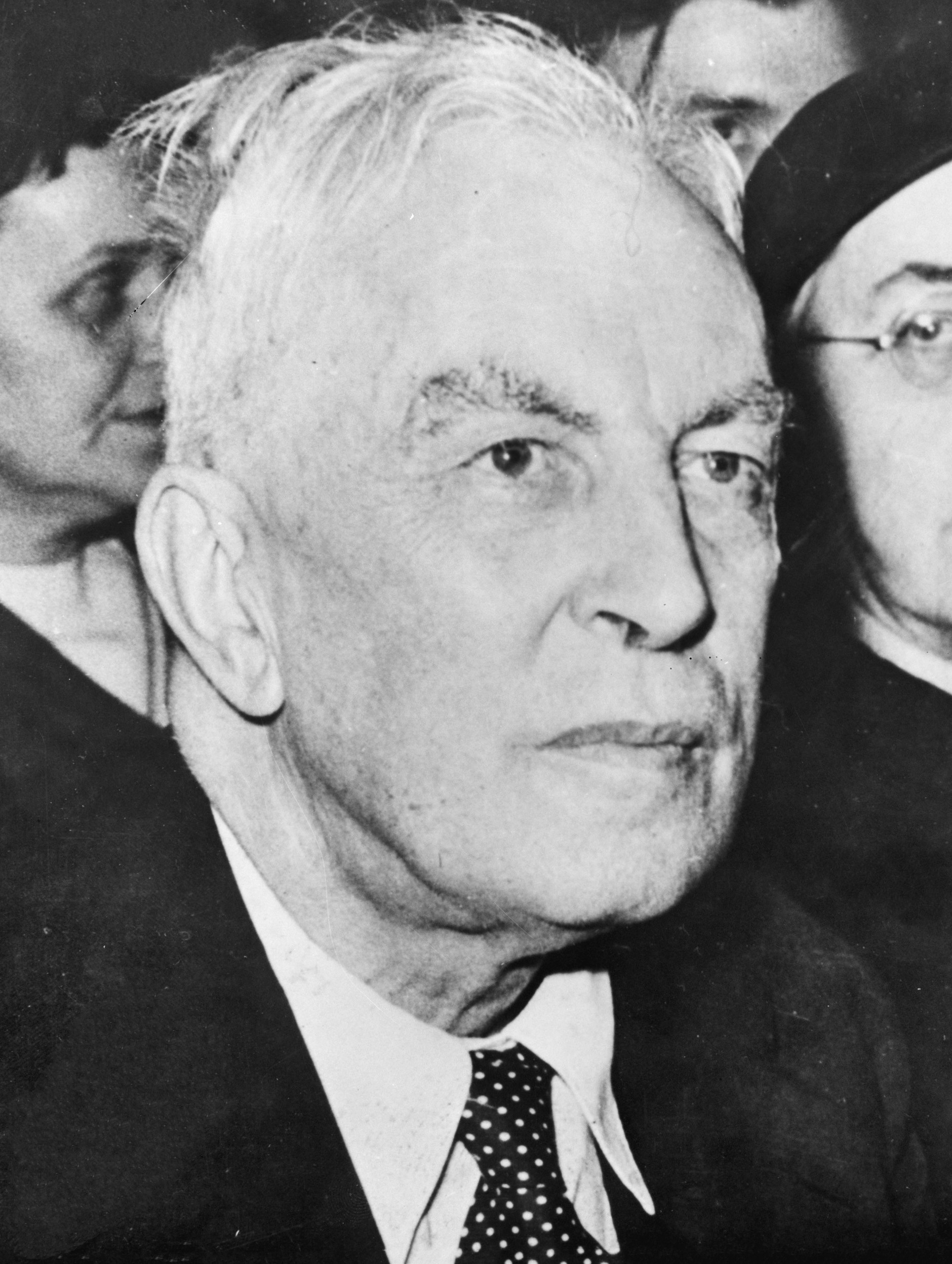
- Toynbee in 1967
- Born: Arnold Joseph Toynbee; 14 April 1889; London, England
- Died: 22 October 1975 (aged 86); York, England
- Spouses: Rosalind Murray (m. 1913; div. 1946); Veronica M. Boulter (m. 1946)
- Children: 3, including Philip
- Relatives: Arnold Toynbee (uncle); Jocelyn Toynbee (sister)

Academic background
- Education: Balliol College, Oxford
- Influences: Carl Jung; Ibn Khaldun; Anton Hilckman; Oswald Spengler

Academic work
- Discipline: History
- Institutions: University of Oxford; King's College London; London School of Economics; Royal Institute of International Affairs; New College of Florida
- Main interests: Universal history
- Notable works: A Study of History
- Influenced: Christopher Dawson; Carroll Quigley; David Wilkinson

Arnold Joseph Toynbee (/ˈtɔɪnbi/; 14 April 1889 – 22 October 1975) was an English historian, a philosopher of history, an author of numerous books and a research professor of international history at the London School of Economics and King's College London. From 1918 to 1950, Toynbee was considered a leading specialist on international affairs; from 1929 to 1956 he was the Director of Studies at Chatham House, in which position he also produced 34 volumes of the Survey of International Affairs, a "bible" for international specialists in Britain.

He is best known for his 12-volume A Study of History (1934–1961). With his large output of papers, articles, speeches, presentations, and numerous books translated into many languages, Toynbee was widely read and discussed in the 1940s and 1950s.

== Biography ==
=== Early life and education ===
Toynbee was born on 14 April 1889 in London, England, to Harry Valpy Toynbee (1861–1941), secretary of the Charity Organization Society, and his wife Sarah Edith Marshall (1859–1939). His mother took the equivalent of an undergraduate degree in English history at Cambridge University, when higher education for women was unusual and before women were allowed to graduate from the university, and his sister Jocelyn Toynbee was an archaeologist and art historian. Arnold Toynbee was a grandson of Joseph Toynbee, a nephew of the 19th-century economist Arnold Toynbee (1852–1883), and a descendant of prominent British intellectuals for several generations.

Having won a scholarship, he was educated at Winchester College, an all-boys independent boarding school in Winchester, Hampshire. From 1907 to 1911, having won a scholarship to Oxford University, he read literae humaniores (i.e. classics) at Balliol College, Oxford. Early in Toynbee's degree, his father suffered a nervous collapse and was institutionalised, causing financial difficulties for the family. Regardless, Toynbee achieved first class honours in mods and in greats and graduated with a Bachelor of Arts (BA) degree. From 1911 to 1912, he toured Italy and Greece to study the classical landscape and remains that "he had thitherto known only through books".

=== Career ===
In 1912, having returned from his travels, Toynbee was elected a fellow of his alma mater Balliol College, Oxford, and appointed a tutor in ancient history. Unusually for a British classical scholar of that time, his interests crossed Greek and Roman civilisation, and ranged from Bronze Age Greece to the Byzantine Empire. He also combined traditional classical literary scholarship with the emerging discipline of classical archaeology.

=== Paris Peace Conference ===
He served as a delegate to the Paris Peace Conference in 1919, where he helped shape the Treaty of Sèvres. He was present at the meeting at the Hotel Majestic when Lionel Curtis proposed the formation of an Institute of International Affairs, resulting in the formation of Chatham House in London and The Council on Foreign Relations in New York.

=== Historian and Director of Studies ===
In 1925 he became research professor of international history at the London School of Economics. In 1929 he became Director of Studies at the Royal Institute of International Affairs (Chatham House), a post he held until 1956. He was elected a Fellow of the British Academy (FBA) in 1937. He was elected an International Member of the American Philosophical Society in 1941 and an International Honorary Member of the American Academy of Arts and Sciences in 1949.

=== Personal life ===
His first marriage was to Rosalind Murray (1890–1967), daughter of Gilbert Murray, in 1913; they had three sons, of whom Philip Toynbee was the second. Their son Lawrence (born 1922) was a painter and married Jean Constance Asquith, granddaughter of Prime Minister H. H. Asquith. Arnold and Rosalind divorced in 1946; Toynbee then married his research assistant, Veronica M. Boulter (1893–1980), in the same year. He died on 22 October 1975, age 86.

== Views on the post-World War I peace settlement and geopolitical situation ==
In his 1915 book Nationality & the War, Toynbee argued that any eventual postwar peace settlement should be guided by the principle of nationality. In Chapter IV of his 1916 book The New Europe: Essays in Reconstruction, Toynbee argued against the competing principle of "natural borders." Toynbee encouraged the use of plebiscites for the allocation of disputed territories, an idea brought to fruition by the postwar use of plebiscites.

In his 1915 book Nationality & the War, Toynbee offered various elaborate proposals and predictions for the future of various countries, both European and non-European. For example, he advocated an autonomous Poland in a federal arrangement with Russia, the retention of Austro-Hungarian dominion over Czech and Slovak lands, Austro-Hungarian relinquishment of Galicia, Transylvania, and Bukovina, independence for Bosnia, Croatia, and Slovenia, the division of Bessarabia between Russia and Romania and joint use by those two countries of the port of Odessa, Russian acquisition of Outer Mongolia and the Tarim Basin in central Asia and of Pontus and the Armenian Vilayets in the Ottoman Empire, a strong, independent, central government in Persia. and a Russo-British partitioning of Afghanistan.

== Academic and cultural influence ==
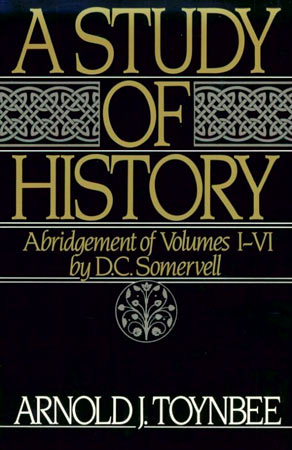
Somervell's abridgement of Toynbee's magnum opus A Study of History

Toynbee on the front cover of Time magazine, 17 March 1947

Michael Lang says that for much of the twentieth century,

Toynbee was perhaps the world's most read, translated, and discussed living scholar. His output was enormous, hundreds of books, pamphlets, and articles. Of these, scores were translated into thirty different languages....the critical reaction to Toynbee constitutes a veritable intellectual history of the midcentury: we find a long list of the period's most important historians, Beard, Braudel, Collingwood, and so on.

Toynbee's approach may be compared to the one used by Oswald Spengler in The Decline of the West. He rejected, however, Spengler's deterministic view that civilizations rise and fall according to a natural and inevitable cycle.

In his best-known work, A Study of History, published 1934–1961, Toynbee

examined the rise and fall of 26 civilisations in the course of human history, and he concluded that they rose by responding successfully to challenges under the leadership of creative minorities composed of elite leaders.

A Study of History was both a commercial and an academic success. In the US alone, more than 7,000 sets of the ten-volume edition were sold by 1955. A 1947 one-volume abridgement by David Churchill Somervell of the first six volumes sold over 300,000 copies in the US. Toynbee appeared on the cover of Time magazine in 1947, with an article describing his work as "the most provocative work of historical theory written in England since Karl Marx's Capital". He became a regular commentator for the BBC on the then-current hostility between east and west and on non-western views of the western world.

Toynbee's overall theory was taken up by some scholars, such as Ernst Robert Curtius, as a sort of paradigm in the post-war period. In the opening pages of his own study of medieval Latin literature, Curtius wrote:

How do cultures, and the historical entities which are their media, arise, grow and decay? Only a comparative morphology with exact procedures can hope to answer these questions. It was Arnold J. Toynbee who undertook the task.

After 1960, Toynbee's ideas faded in both academia and in popular culture. His work is seldom cited today. In general, historians said he had a preference for myths, allegories, and religion over factual data. His critics argued that his conclusions are more those of a Christian moralist than of a historian. In his 2011 article for the Journal of History titled "Globalization and Global History in Toynbee," historian Michael Lang wrote:

To many world historians today, Arnold J. Toynbee is regarded like an embarrassing uncle at a house party. He gets a requisite introduction by virtue of his place on the family tree, but he is quickly passed over for other friends and relatives.

Toynbee's work continues to be referenced by some classical historians because "his training and surest touch is in the world of classical antiquity." His roots in classical literature are also manifested by similarities between his approach and that of classical historians such as Herodotus and Thucydides. Comparative history, in which his work is often categorised, has been in the doldrums.

Toynbee is thanked in the acknowledgment section of Mark Lane's Rush to Judgment (1966), which critiques the official explanation of the assassination of John F. Kennedy, for having been "kind enough to read the manuscript and make suggestions" to the book. Toynbee endorsed Lane's organization, the Citizens Committee of Inquiry, with his endorsement featuring in an advertisement for the organization.

== Political influence in foreign policy ==
While the writing of the Study was underway, Toynbee produced numerous smaller works and served as Director of Studies of the Royal Institute of International Affairs, Chatham House (from 1929 to 1956). He also retained his position at the London School of Economics until his retirement in 1956.

=== Foreign Office and Paris Peace Conference 1919 ===
Toynbee worked for the Political Intelligence Department of the British Foreign Office during World War I and served as a delegate to the Paris Peace Conference in 1919.

=== Chatham House ===
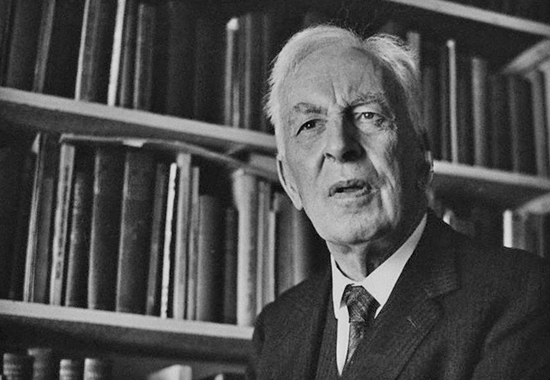
Arnold Toynbee at Chatham House

He was Director of Studies at Chatham House from 1929 to 1956. Toynbee was co-editor with his research assistant, Veronica M. Boulter, of the RIIA's annual Survey of International Affairs, from 1922 to 1956. It became the "bible" for international specialists in Britain.

=== Chatham House's World War II Foreign Press and Research Service ===
At the outbreak of the Second World War the institute was decentralised for security reasons, with many of the staff moving to Balliol College, Oxford from Chatham House's main buildings in St James's Square. There, the Foreign Press and Research Service of the Institute worked closely with the Foreign Office to provide intelligence for and to work closely with the Foreign Office dedicating their research to the war effort under the Chairmanship of Waldorf Astor.

The formal remit of Chatham House for the FPRS at Balliol was:
1. To review the press overseas.
2. To "produce at the request of the Foreign Office, and the Service and other Departments, memoranda giving the historical and political background on any given situation on which information is desired".
3. "To provide information on special points desired" (in regards to each country). It provided various reports on foreign press, historical and political background of the enemy and various other topics.

Many eminent historians served on the FPRS under Arnold J. Toynbee as its director and with Lionel Curtis (represented the chairman) at Oxford until 1941 when Ivison Macadam took over the role from Curtis. There were four deputy directors. The four deputy directors were Alfred Zimmern, George N. Clark, Herbert J. Patton and Charles K. Webster and a number of experts in its nineteen divisions.

The FRBS with Toynbee and his entire team was moved to the Foreign Office 1943–46.

=== Meeting Hitler ===
While on a visit in Berlin in 1936 to address the Law Society, Toynbee was invited to a private interview with Adolf Hitler at Hitler's request. During the interview, which was held a day before Toynbee delivered his lecture, Hitler emphasized his limited expansionist aim of building a greater German nation, and his desire for British understanding and co-operation with Nazi Germany. Hitler also suggested Germany could be an ally to Britain in the Asia-Pacific region if Germany's Pacific colonial empire were restored. Toynbee believed that Hitler was sincere and endorsed Hitler's message in a confidential memorandum for the British prime minister and foreign secretary.

Toynbee presented his lecture in English, but copies of it were circulated in German by Nazi officials, and it was warmly received by his Berlin audience who appreciated its conciliatory tone. Tracy Philipps, a British 'diplomat' stationed in Berlin at the time, later informed Toynbee that it 'was an eager topic of discussion everywhere'. Back home, some of Toynbee's colleagues were dismayed by his attempts at managing Anglo-German relations.

=== Russia ===
Toynbee was troubled by the Russian Revolution since he saw Russia as a non-Western society and the revolution as a threat to Western society. In 1952, he argued that the Soviet Union had been a victim of Western aggression. He portrayed the Cold War as a religious competition that pitted a Marxist materialist heresy against the West's spiritual Christian heritage, which had already been foolishly rejected by a secularised West. A heated debate ensued, and an editorial in The Times promptly attacked Toynbee for treating communism as a "spiritual force".

=== United States ===
In his 1962 America and The World Revolution, Toynbee argued that the United States has undergone a fundamental transformation from the "inspirer and leader" of global revolution to the vanguard of a "world-wide anti-revolutionary movement." He contends that by prioritizing the defense of its unprecedented industrial wealth and "vested interests," America has abandoned its 1775 mission, to adopt a role reminiscent of Imperial Rome or the conservative statesman Metternich—supporting the wealthy minority against the poor majority.

Ultimately, Toynbee suggests that while the "American shot" continues to incite revolutionary fervor across the globe, the U.S. has become "embarrassed and annoyed" by its own legacy, now finding itself psychologically burdened by the defensive, joyless task of shoring up global inequality against the very forces it originally unleashed.

=== Greece, Turkey and the Koraes Chair of Modern Greek and Byzantine History ===
In November 1911, Toynbee visited Greece. According to Richard Clogg, Toynbee "had privately manifested not mere dislike of, but a profound loathing for, the modern inhabitants of the Greek lands", a sentiment which developed extremely intensely and extremely rapidly, just a few days after his visit, since his idealized vision of ancient Greece collided with modern Greek reality.

At the start of the First World War, Toynbee was found to be unfit for military service because of a bout of dysentery after his return from Greece. In 1915, he began working for the intelligence department of the British Foreign Office. He worked under Viscount Bryce to investigate the Ottoman atrocities against the Armenians and also wrote a number of pro-Allied leaflets.

Ronald Burrows, a staunch philhellene, was unaware of Toynbee's earlier anti-Greek sentiment and, in 1919, backed Toynbee's appointment to the Koraes Chair of Modern Greek and Byzantine History at King's College, University of London, despite Toynbee's own warning that "[t]he chair should be held by 'more of an active Philhellene' than he felt himself to be".

In 1921 and 1922 he was the Manchester Guardian correspondent during the Greco-Turkish War, an experience that resulted in the publication of The Western Question in Greece and Turkey. In the book, Toynbee expressed pro-Turkish sympathies and anti-Greek sentiment. The work was considered to have been so egregious that Toynbee was forced to resign from his academic position as the Koraes Chair. After a letter by Toynbee to The Times on 3 January 1924, his pro-Turkish sentiments became widely known.

In his era, Toynbee's publication became infamous in Britain; it was accused of being "a one-sided apologetic narrative favoring the Turkish point of view". Even David Lloyd George lamented how Toynbee had turned "pro-Turk" and had "forsaken the Gladstonian position". Robert William Seton-Watson was harsher, noting how "at the supreme crisis in the fate of the Greek nation – probably without exaggeration the most decisive since Xerxes" Toynbee had "plunged into a violent propagandist campaign in favour of the Turks". George William Rendel wrote that Toynbee was "notorious for [his] virulent hatred of Greece, for passionate championship of the Turks and for total lack of balance and judgment on any questions connected with the Greco-Turkish conflict". A reviewer in The Journal of Hellenic Studies challenged Toynbee's assumptions, arguing that Turkish massacres were an "organised system", unlike Christian massacres which were usually sporadic.

American diplomat George Horton believed that the book was "missing the forest for the trees", writing:

One of the cleverest statements circulated by the Turkish propagandists is to the effect that the massacred Christians were as bad as their executioners, that it was “50-50.” This especially appeals strongly to the Anglo-Saxon sense of justice, relieves one of all further annoyance or responsibility, and quiets the conscience. But it requires a very thoughtless person indeed to accept such a statement, and extremely little thought required to show the fallacy of it. [...] the long history of butcheries that have soaked the [Ottoman] empire with blood, the reckoning, mathematically, will not be 50-50, nor even one to ten thousand.

In today's era, historians Benny Morris and Dror Ze’evi note that Toynbee played a "bothsideist" role in the conflict. They criticize this attempted "moral equivalence" as fraudulent, questionable and exaggerated against Greeks. They also state that Toynbee, like Mark Lambert Bristol, described several alleged massacres of Turks by Greeks to which he wasn't an eyewitness to, but rather accepted them as fact after being "fed information" by leading Turks.

Historian Richard Clogg also wrote that Toynbee was motivated by "mishellenism", adding that although Greeks placed no restriction on Toynbee's travels, the Turks purposely kept him away from sites in which massacres were suspected to have occurred. Professor of Modern History Rebecca Gill wrote that Toynbee's arguments are uncomfortably reminiscent of denialist arguments made by Turkish nationalist historians. Toynbee also initially falsely asserted that the Greeks burnt down Smyrna, although he later backtracked and accepted Turkish responsibility.

Toynbee's proclivities were so bad that even his mother, a highly educated woman, reproached him about them. In addition, according to David S. Katz, "When E. M. Forster (1879–1970) foolishly involved Toynbee in a plan to translate into English the works of the Egyptian-Greek poet Constantine Cavafy (1863–1933), the project went cold".

Toynbee's "transmogrification" from anti-Turkish to pro-Turkish in the 1920s did not occur out of any humanitarian concern, but rather due to four key factors. First, he was convinced that a secularized Turkish state would help stabilize the post-war European-dominated international order and simultaneously counter pan-Islamist propaganda. Second, he was influenced by the primacy he attached to derailing David Lloyd George's Near Eastern policy and developing an alternative international response, which was connected to resolving an intellectual puzzle about the history of civilizations. Third, he may have been motivated by a desire to "atone" for his previous work against the Ottoman Empire and his service to the British Government, which he bitterly regretted. Lastly, he was motivated by mishellenism, a dislike of Greece and Greeks, a sentiment that he had espoused since 1911.

=== Cyprus ===
In 1923, Toynbee supported enosis between Greece and Cyprus, as well as the cession of the Dodecanese by Italy to Greece, on the principle that all islands were majority Greek. In 1931, he reiterated this view.

In 1966, writing that he was "neither pro-Turk or pro-Greek" on the subject, and on the grounds of Cyprus being 82% Greek and only 18% Turkish, Toynbee supported enosis between Greece and Cyprus, but with "compensation" being offered to Turkey in return, such as the remodeling of the Greek-Turkish border in Thrace.

=== Middle East ===
His stance during World War I reflected less sympathy for the Arab cause and took a pro-Zionist outlook. Toynbee investigated Zionism in 1915 at the Information Department of the Foreign Office, and in 1917 he published a memorandum with his colleague Lewis Namier which supported exclusive Jewish political rights in Ottoman Palestine. He expressed support for Jewish immigration to Palestine, which he believed had "begun to recover its ancient prosperity" as a result. Historian Isaiah Friedman felt Toynbee had been influenced by the Palestine Arab delegation which was visiting London in 1922.

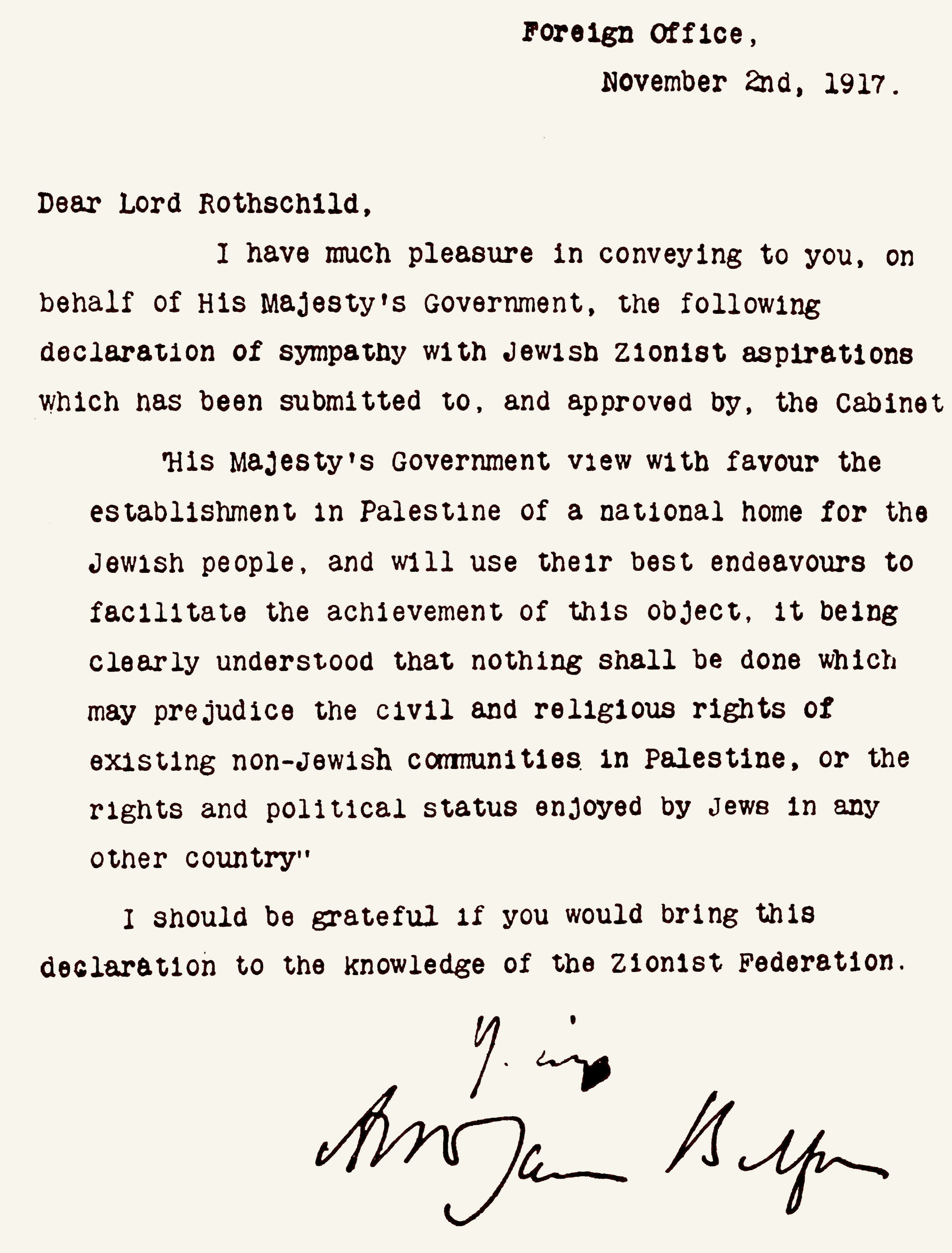
The Balfour declaration. The British Library

His subsequent writings reveal his changing outlook on the subject, and by the late 1940s he had moved away from the Zionist concept taking into account the Palestine Arabs' tenure. Toynbee maintained that the Jewish people had neither historic nor legal claims to Palestine, stating that the Arab "population's human rights to their homes and property over-ride all other rights in cases where claims conflict." Toynbee did concede that Jews, "being the only surviving representatives of any of the pre-Arab inhabitants of Palestine, had a further claim to a national home in Palestine," but even so Toynbee felt the Balfour Declaration had guaranteed that such a claim was valid "only in so far as it can be implemented without injury to the rights and to the legitimate interests of the native Arab population of Palestine."

Although not the official view of Chatham House which discussed numerous opinions on the then evolving situation, Toynbee came to be known, by his own admission, as "the Western spokesman for the Arab cause." The views Toynbee expressed in the 1950s continued to oppose the formation of a Jewish state, partly out of his concern that it would increase the risk of Middle East conflict with the Jews and Arabs and could lead to a nuclear confrontation. Toynbee, in his article in the Jewish Quarterly Review, "Jewish Rights in Palestine", which were at odds with the views of the editor, also an historian and a Talmudic scholar Solomon Zeitlin, who wrote his own response in the same edition, "Jewish Rights in Eretz Israel (Palestine)".

However, as a result of Toynbee's debate in January 1961 with Yaakov Herzog, the Israeli ambassador to Canada, Toynbee softened his view and called on Israel, by then established, to fulfil its special "mission to make contributions to worldwide efforts to prevent the outbreak of nuclear war."

==== Criticism ====
Though Toynbee co-authoured papers with and commissioned articles from Jewish scholars, and included Jewish friends among those whom he praised in his book Acquaintances, Toynbee's views on Judaism and Middle East politics prompted allegations of antisemitism. Israel Ambassador to the United States Abba Eban's 1955 speech The Toynbee Heresy, for example, bases the accusation of antisemitism on, among other things, the allegedly negative portrayal of Judaism in A Study of History, Toynbee's frequent use of the adjective Judaic to describe episodes of "extreme brutality" even where Jews were not involved, as in the Gothic persecution of Christians, Toynbee's reference to the Jewish presence in Palestine at the time of the publication of A Study of History as merely a "fossil remnant", and his portrayal of Judaism as fanatical and provincial and as having advanced the cause of civilization only as a seedbed for Christianity.

Other criticisms in the The Toynbee Heresy speech, include Toynbee's view that Zionism offends Jewish piety by attempting to effect a return to the Mideast through secular means rather than entrusting it to a divinely promised Messiah, and certain troubling passages in Toynbee's oeuvres, such as a passage in Vol.8 of A Study of History in which Toynbee wrote that, "On the Day of Judgement, the gravest crime standing to the German National Socialists' account might be, not that they had exterminated a majority of the Western Jews, but that they had caused the surviving remnant of Jewry to stumble."

=== Dialogue with Daisaku Ikeda ===
In 1971 and 1973, Toynbee met and corresponded with Daisaku Ikeda, president of the Soka Gakkai International. Their dialogue was later edited and presented in the form of a book, Choose Life. His reputation was growing in Japan long before Ikeda made his approach. Toynbee took Japanese culture and history seriously. He was pessimistic about the fate of western civilization. He was genuinely interested in religions such as Shinto and, particularly, Buddhism... and the late 1960s was an era of 'New Age' gurus such as Buckminster Fuller and the Maharishi Mahesh Yogi. Toynbee was starting to play such a role for Japan, whether Ikeda had approached him or not, writes historian Louis Turner. In 1984 his granddaughter Polly Toynbee wrote an article for The Guardian attributing her late grandfather's association with Ikeda as a consequence of his old age, frailty and trusting nature.

== Challenge and response ==
Toynbee presented history as the rise and fall of civilisations, rather than the history of nation-states or of ethnic groups. He identified civilisations according to cultural rather than national criteria. Thus, the "Western Civilisation," comprising all the nations that have existed in Western Europe since the collapse of the Roman Empire, was treated as a whole, and distinguished from both the "Orthodox" civilisation of Russia and the Balkans, and from the Greco-Roman civilisation that preceded it.

With the civilisations as units identified, he presented the history of each in terms of challenge-and-response, a process he proposed as a scientific law of history. Civilizations arose in response to some set of extreme challenges, when "creative minorities" devised new solutions that reoriented their entire society. Challenges and responses were physical, as when the Sumerians exploited the intractable swamps of southern Iraq by organising the Neolithic inhabitants into a society capable of carrying out large-scale irrigation projects, or social, as when the Catholic Church resolved the chaos of post-Roman Europe by enrolling the new Germanic kingdoms in a single religious community.

When civilisations responded to challenges, they grew, but they disintegrated when their leaders stopped responding creatively, sinking into nationalism, militarism, and the tyranny of a despotic minority. According to an Editor's Note in an edition of Toynbee's A Study of History, Toynbee believed that societies always die from suicide or murder rather than natural causes; and nearly always the former. Toynbee sees the growth and decline of civilizations as a spiritual process, writing that "Man achieves civilization, not as a result of superior biological endowment or geographical environment, but as a response to a challenge in a situation of special difficulty which rouses him to make a hitherto unprecedented effort."

== Toynbee Prize Foundation ==
Named after Arnold J. Toynbee, the [Toynbee Prize] Foundation was chartered in 1987 'to contribute to the development of the social sciences, as defined from a broad historical view of human society and of human and social problems.' In addition to awarding the Toynbee Prize, the foundation sponsors scholarly engagement with global history through sponsorship of sessions at the annual meeting of the American Historical Association, of international conferences, of the journal New Global Studies and of the Global History Forum.

The Toynbee Prize is an honorary award, recognising social scientists for significant academic and public contributions to humanity. Currently, it is awarded every other year for work that makes a significant contribution to the study of global history. The recipients include Raymond Aron, Lord Kenneth Clark, Sir Ralf Dahrendorf, Natalie Zemon Davis, Albert Hirschman, George Kennan, Bruce Mazlish, J. R. McNeill, William McNeill, Jean-Paul Sartre, Arthur Schlesinger Jr., Barbara Ward, Lady Jackson, Sir Brian Urquhart, Michael Adas, Christopher Bayly, Jürgen Osterhammel and Sunil Amrith.

== Toynbee's works ==
- The Armenian Atrocities: The Murder of a Nation, with a speech delivered by Lord Bryce in the House of Lords (Hodder & Stoughton, 1915)
- Nationality and the War (Dent, 1915)
- The New Europe: Some Essays in Reconstruction, with an Introduction by the Earl of Cromer (Dent, 1915)
- Contributor, Greece, in The Balkans: A History of Bulgaria, Serbia, Greece, Rumania, Turkey. Oxford: Clarendon Press. 1915. pp. 163–250 – via Internet Archive. (co-author with Nevill Forbes, David Mitrany and David George Hogarth).
- British View of the Ukrainian Question (Ukrainian Federation of U.S., New York, 1916)
- Editor, The Treatment of Armenians in the Ottoman Empire, 1915–1916: Documents Presented to Viscount Grey of Fallodon by Viscount Bryce, with a Preface by Viscount Bryce (Hodder & Stoughton and His Majesty's Stationery Office, 1916)
- The Destruction of Poland: A Study in German Efficiency (T. Fisher Unwin, 1916)
- The Belgian Deportations, with a statement by Viscount Bryce (T. Fisher Unwin, 1917)
- The German Terror in Belgium: An Historical Record (Hodder & Stoughton, 1917)
- The German Terror in France: An Historical Record (Hodder & Stoughton, 1917)
- Turkey: A Past and a Future (Hodder & Stoughton, 1917)
- The Western Question in Greece and Turkey: A Study in the Contact of Civilizations (Constable, 1922)
- Introduction and translations, Greek Civilization and Character: The Self-Revelation of Ancient Greek Society (Dent, 1924)
- Introduction and translations, Greek Historical Thought from Homer to the Age of Heraclius, with two pieces newly translated by Gilbert Murray (Dent, 1924)
- Contributor, The Non-Arab Territories of the Ottoman Empire since the Armistice of 30 October 1918, in H. W. V. Temperley (editor), A History of the Peace Conference of Paris, Vol. VI (Oxford University Press under the auspices of the British Institute of International Affairs, 1924)
- The World after the Peace Conference, Being an Epilogue to the "History of the Peace Conference of Paris" and a Prologue to the "Survey of International Affairs, 1920–1923" (Oxford University Press under the auspices of the British Institute of International Affairs, 1925). Published on its own, but Toynbee writes that it was "originally written as an introduction to the Survey of International Affairs in 1920–1923, and was intended for publication as part of the same volume".
- With Kenneth P. Kirkwood, Turkey (Benn 1926, in Modern Nations series edited by H. A. L. Fisher)
- The Conduct of British Empire Foreign Relations since the Peace Settlement (Oxford University Press under the auspices of the Royal Institute of International Affairs, 1928)
- A Journey to China, or Things Which Are Seen (Constable, 1931)
- Editor, British Commonwealth Relations, Proceedings of the First Unofficial Conference at Toronto, 11–21 September 1933, with a foreword by Robert L. Borden (Oxford University Press under the joint auspices of the Royal Institute of International Affairs and the Canadian Institute of International Affairs, 1934)
- A Study of History
  - Vol I: Introduction; The Geneses of Civilizations
  - Vol II: The Geneses of Civilizations
  - Vol III: The Growths of Civilizations

(Oxford University Press, 1934)

- Editor, with J. A. K. Thomson, Essays in Honour of Gilbert Murray (George Allen & Unwin, 1936)
- A Study of History
  - Vol IV: The Breakdowns of Civilizations
  - Vol V: The Disintegrations of Civilizations
  - Vol VI: The Disintegrations of Civilizations

(Oxford University Press, 1939)

- D. C. Somervell, A Study of History: Abridgement of Vols I-VI, with a preface by Toynbee (Oxford University Press, 1946)
- Civilization on Trial (Oxford University Press, 1948)
- The Prospects of Western Civilization (New York, Columbia University Press, 1949). Lectures delivered at Columbia University on themes from a then-unpublished part of A Study of History. Published "by arrangement with Oxford University Press in an edition limited to 400 copies and not to be reissued".
- Albert Vann Fowler (editor), War and Civilization, Selections from A Study of History, with a preface by Toynbee (New York, Oxford University Press 1950)
- Introduction and translations, Twelve Men of Action in Greco-Roman History (Boston, Beacon Press, 1952). Extracts from Thucydides, Xenophon, Plutarch and Polybius.
- The World and the West (Oxford University Press, 1953). Reith Lectures for 1952.
- A Study of History
  - Vol VII: Universal States; Universal Churches
  - Vol VIII: Heroic Ages; Contacts between Civilizations in Space
  - Vol IX: Contacts between Civilizations in Time; Law and Freedom in History; The Prospects of the Western Civilization
  - Vol X: The Inspirations of Historians; A Note on Chronology

(Oxford University Press, 1954)

- An Historian's Approach to Religion (Oxford University Press, 1956). Gifford Lectures, University of Edinburgh, 1952–1953.
- D. C. Somervell, A Study of History: Abridgement of Vols VII-X, with a preface by Toynbee (Oxford University Press, 1957)
- Christianity among the Religions of the World (New York, Scribner 1957; London, Oxford University Press 1958). Hewett Lectures, delivered in 1956.
- Democracy in the Atomic Age (Melbourne, Oxford University Press under the auspices of the Australian Institute of International Affairs, 1957). Dyason Lectures, delivered in 1956.
- East to West: A Journey round the World (Oxford University Press, 1958)
- Hellenism: The History of a Civilization (Oxford University Press, 1959, in Home University Library)
- With Edward D. Myers, A Study of History
  - Vol XI: Historical Atlas and Gazetteer

(Oxford University Press, 1959)

- D. C. Somervell, A Study of History: Abridgement of Vols I–X in one volume, with a new preface by Toynbee and new tables (Oxford University Press, 1960)
- A Study of History
  - Vol XII: Reconsiderations

(Oxford University Press, 1961)

- Between Oxus and Jumna (Oxford University Press, 1961). Account of a journey made in North-West India, West Pakistan and Afghanistan during the early months of 1960.
- America and the World Revolution (Oxford University Press, 1962). Public lectures delivered at the University of Pennsylvania, spring 1961.
- The Economy of the Western Hemisphere (Oxford University Press, 1962). Weatherhead Foundation Lectures delivered at the University of Puerto Rico, February 1962.
- The Present-Day Experiment in Western Civilization (Oxford University Press, 1962). Beatty Memorial Lectures delivered at McGill University, Montreal, 1961.

The three sets of lectures published separately in the UK in 1962 appeared in New York in the same year in one volume under the title America and the World Revolution and Other Lectures, Oxford University Press.

- Universal States (New York, Oxford University Press, 1963). Separate publication of part of Vol VII of A Study of History.
- With Philip Toynbee, Comparing Notes: A Dialogue across a Generation (Weidenfeld & Nicolson, 1963). "Conversations between Arnold Toynbee and his son, Philip… as they were recorded on tape."
- Between Niger and Nile (Oxford University Press, 1965)
- Hannibal's Legacy: The Hannibalic War's Effects on Roman Life
  - Vol I: Rome and Her Neighbours before Hannibal's Entry
  - Vol II: Rome and Her Neighbours after Hannibal's Exit

(Oxford University Press, 1965)

- Change and Habit: The Challenge of Our Time (Oxford University Press, 1966). Partly based on lectures given at University of Denver in the last quarter of 1964, and at New College of Florida and the University of the South, Sewanee, Tennessee in the first quarter of 1965.
- Acquaintances (Oxford University Press, 1967)
- Between Maule and Amazon (Oxford University Press, 1967)
- Editor, Cities of Destiny (Thames & Hudson, 1967)
- Editor and principal contributor, Man's Concern with Death (Hodder & Stoughton, 1968)
- Editor, The Crucible of Christianity: Judaism, Hellenism and the Historical Background to the Christian Faith (Thames & Hudson, 1969)
- Experiences (Oxford University Press, 1969)
- Some Problems of Greek History (Oxford University Press, 1969)
- Cities on the Move (Oxford University Press, 1970). Sponsored by the Institute of Urban Environment of the School of Architecture, Columbia University.
- Surviving the Future (Oxford University Press, 1971). Rewritten version of a dialogue between Toynbee and Professor Kei Wakaizumi of Kyoto Sangyo University: essays preceded by questions by Wakaizumi.
- With Jane Caplan, A Study of History, new one-volume abridgement, with new material and revisions and, for the first time, illustrations (Oxford University Press and Thames & Hudson, 1972)
- Constantine Porphyrogenitus and His World (Oxford University Press, 1973)
- Editor, Half the World: The History and Culture of China and Japan (Thames & Hudson, 1973)
- Toynbee on Toynbee: A Conversation between Arnold J. Toynbee and G. R. Urban (New York, Oxford University Press, 1974)
- Mankind and Mother Earth: A Narrative History of the World (Oxford University Press, 1976), posthumous.
- Richard L. Gage (editor), The Toynbee-Ikeda Dialogue: Man Himself Must Choose (Oxford University Press, 1976), posthumous. The record of a conversation lasting several days.
- E. W. F. Tomlin (editor), Arnold Toynbee: A Selection from His Works, with an introduction by Tomlin (Oxford University Press, 1978), posthumous. Includes advance extracts from The Greeks and Their Heritages.
- The Greeks and Their Heritages (Oxford University Press, 1981), posthumous.
- Christian B. Peper (editor), An Historian's Conscience: The Correspondence of Arnold J. Toynbee and Columba Cary-Elwes, Monk of Ampleforth, with a foreword by Lawrence L. Toynbee (Oxford University Press by arrangement with Beacon Press, Boston, 1987), posthumous.
- The Survey of International Affairs was published by Oxford University Press under the auspices of the Royal Institute of International Affairs between 1925 and 1977 and covered the years 1920–63. Toynbee wrote, with assistants, the Pre-War Series (covering the years 1920–38) and the War-Time Series (1938–46), and contributed introductions to the first two volumes of the Post-War Series (1947–48 and 1949–50). His actual contributions varied in extent from year to year.
- A complementary series, Documents on International Affairs, covering the years 1928–63, was published by Oxford University Press between 1929 and 1973. Toynbee supervised the compilation of the first of the 1939–46 volumes, and wrote a preface for both that and the 1947–48 volume.

== See also ==
- Fernand Braudel
- Christopher Dawson
- Will Durant
- Historic recurrence
- Carroll Quigley
- Oswald Spengler
- Toynbee tiles
- Eric Voegelin
- World history
