= Gene Kelly (disambiguation) =

Gene Kelly (1912–1996) was an American actor, dancer, singer, and producer.

Gene or Eugene Kelly may also refer to:

- Eugene Kelly (banker) (1808–1894), Irish-American businessman and philanthropist
- Gene Kelly (broadcaster) (1918–1979), American sportscaster
- Gene Kiniski (1928–2010), Canadian professional wrestler, also billed as Gene Kelly
- Eugene Kelly (born 1965), Scottish musician

== See also ==
- Eugene O'Kelly, American financial executive
- Jean Kelly (disambiguation)
