= Eppler =

Eppler is a surname. Notable people with the surname include:

- Billy Eppler (born 1975), American baseball executive
- Dieter Eppler (1927–2008), German television actor and director of radio dramas
- Erhard Eppler (1926–2019), German politician
- Johannes Eppler (1914–1999), German World War II spy
- Martin J. Eppler (born 1971), Swiss communication and management scholar
- Shelton Eppler (born c. 1998), American football player
- Tyler Eppler (born 1993), American professional baseball pitcher
