= Study of History =

Study of History may refer to:

- A Study of History, a 12-volume book by British historian Arnold J. Toynbee, finished in 1961
- Historiography, the study of history
