= East to West (book) =

1958 travel book by Arnold J. Toynbee

East to West: A Journey Round the World
- Author: Arnold J. Toynbee
- Language: English
- Genre: Travel literature, essays
- Publisher: Oxford University Press
- Publication date: 1958

East to West: A Journey Round the World is a 1958 travel book by British historian Arnold J. Toynbee, published by Oxford University Press.

Combining accounts of places visited with historical, religious and political reflections, the book focuses particularly on the remains of past civilizations and their relationship to the modern world.

The book received mixed reviews. Critics praised Toynbee's historical knowledge, observations, and descriptions of the places he visited, but some questioned his broad generalizations, limited engagement with contemporary political and economic issues, and occasionally difficult prose.

== Background ==
The book was Toynbee's (who was born in 1889) second collection of travel writing, following A Journey to China, or Things Which Are Seen (1931), based on his travels in 1929. Both works originated as short contributions to periodicals. The latter collects essays originally written for The Observer during a journey around the world with his wife in 1956–1957.

In a comparison of the two, James E. McClellan noted that the format gave individual observations immediacy but limited the development of sustained arguments. The later journey also enabled Toynbee to see remains of ancient civilizations that he had previously studied primarily through books.

== Contents ==
The book consists of 73 travel essays. Toynbee's journey takes him through South America, the Pacific and Asia, and onward to the Middle East. His observations combine descriptions of historical sites with reflections on religion, society and political change.

In South America, he discusses the fortifications of Cartagena and remains of the Inca Empire. Later essays describe Australia, Japan and Southeast Asia, including the Buddhist monument of Borobudur in Indonesia and the temples of Angkor in Cambodia. These sites prompt comparisons between different civilizations and religious traditions.

Several essays concern India and neighbouring regions, addressing temples, fortresses, rivers and aspects of social and economic change. Other topics discussed include the Chinese diaspora, Indonesia and Japan, and developments in the Middle East. The journey also includes Ceylon (now Sri Lanka), Pakistan and countries of the Middle East.

== Reception ==
Contemporary reviewers differed in their assessments of the book's historical insights. In Foreign Affairs, Henry L. Roberts praised Toynbee's perceptiveness and ability to draw on extensive historical knowledge, suggesting that the experiences might have enriched his earlier A Study of History had he travelled before writing it. Writing in International Affairs, A. F. Whyte likewise praised the range of Toynbee's observations and regarded him as a stimulating guide to history, despite objections that some professional historians had raised to his historical interpretations. Kirkus Reviews characterized the work as a collection of historical and philosophical essays rather than a conventional travelogue, likely to appeal more to historically minded readers than to a general travel audience.

Reviewers also disagreed over Toynbee's treatment of contemporary societies. In The Foreign Service Journal, E. J. Beigel considered roughly a third of the 73 essays especially valuable, particularly those addressing social, religious and economic history. He praised Toynbee's discussion of subjects including overseas Chinese communities, economic development in India and issues in the Middle East. In The Spectator, Anthony Hartley appreciated the descriptions of Cartagena's fortifications and Indian forts and temples, but criticized the relative neglect of contemporary social and political conflicts, including conditions in Peru and the situation of Arab refugees. He also objected to what he saw as facile generalizations across cultures and religions.

In a longer analysis for Comparative Education Review, James E. McClellan compared East to West with Toynbee's earlier travel writing. While admiring Toynbee's descriptions of nature and historical remains, McClellan argued that his later reliance on a comprehensive theory of history sometimes obscured contemporary political and economic realities. As an example, he criticized Toynbee's treatment of the relationship between the Saudi ruler and Aramco through a fable about a king and a jinn. McClellan used the comparison to discuss how interpretive frameworks can both sharpen and distort observations of other societies. In International Journal, Frank H. Underhill noted Toynbee's hostility to modern mechanized and secularized Western civilization, illustrated by his speculation about peasant communities surviving a nuclear catastrophe.

The prose itself received contrasting judgments. Kirkus Reviews praised the writing but found the density of historical references challenging for readers unfamiliar with the places discussed. Whyte appreciated the book's lightness of touch and variety, whereas an anonymous reviewer in The New Yorker found Toynbee's prose nearly unreadable, criticizing its exclamations, autobiographical digressions, apostrophes, rhetorical questions and anticlimaxes, while acknowledging the potential interest of his accounts of rarely visited ruins. Underhill similarly found Toynbee's learning exhausting when read continuously and objected to his ecstatic descriptions of Borobudur and Angkor and rhetorical addresses to Indian rivers. He nevertheless considered the book enjoyable when read at a leisurely pace and not taken too seriously. Paul Andrews, reviewing the book in Studies: An Irish Quarterly Review, praised its value for teachers of history and geography but found it heavily laden with comparisons and factual detail; he also questioned Toynbee's numerous predictions and sentimental treatment of religion.
