= Why the West Rules—For Now =

2010 book by Ian Morris

Why the West Rules — For Now
- First edition
- Author: Ian Morris
- Language: English
- Subject: Human geography, cultural anthropology, archaeology, history
- Published: 2010 (Farrar, Straus and Giroux)
- Publication place: United States
- Media type: Hardcover, Paperback
- Pages: 768 pages
- ISBN: 978-0-374-29002-3 (1st edition, hardcover)

Why the West Rules—For Now: The Patterns of History, and What They Reveal About the Future is a history book by a British historian Ian Morris, published in 2010.

== Content ==
The book compares East and West across the last 15,000 years, arguing that physical geography rather than culture, religion, politics, genetics, or great men explains Western domination of the globe. Morris' Social Development Index considers the amount of energy a civilization can usefully capture, its ability to organize (measured by the size of its largest cities), war-making capability (weapons, troop strength, logistics), and information technology (speed and reach of writing, printing, telecommunication, etc.).

The evidence and statistical methods used in this book are explained in more detail in Social Development, a free eBook, and by the published volume, The Measure of Civilization.

Morris argues that:

- When agriculture was first invented, areas with reliable rainfall benefited most.
- Irrigation benefited drier areas such as Egypt and the Fertile Crescent.
- Plants and animals that were more easily domesticated gave certain areas an early advantage, especially the Fertile Crescent and China. (See cradle of civilization.) Development of Africa and the Americas started on the same path, but it was delayed by thousands of years.
- With the development of ships in Eurasia, rivers became trade routes. Europe and empires in Greece and Rome benefited from the Mediterranean, compared to Chinese empires (who later built the Grand Canal for similar purposes).
- Raids from the Eurasian Steppe brought diseases that caused epidemics in settled populations.
- The Social Development Index shows the West leading until the 6th century, China leading until the 18th century, and the West leading again in the modern era.
- After the development of ocean-going ships, the significantly greater size of the Pacific Ocean made trans-Atlantic exploration and trade more feasible and profitable for Europe than trans-Pacific exploration and trade for East Asia. Though the mariner's compass was invented in China in the 11th century, Chinese exploration was less successful than the European Age of Discovery and subsequent colonization.
- Eurasian diseases to which people in the Americas had no immunity were a byproduct of Eurasian development that devastated Native Americans after contact, in addition to superior European weapons.
- Globalization and advances in information technology are leveling differences between civilizational areas.

== Reception ==
The book won several literary awards, including the 2011 PEN Center USA Literary Award for Creative Nonfiction and 2011 GetAbstract International Book Award, and was named as one of the books of the year by Newsweek, Foreign Affairs, Foreign Policy, The New York Times, and a number of other newspapers. It has been translated into 13 languages. The Economist has called it "an important book—one that challenges, stimulates and entertains. Anyone who does not believe there are lessons to be learned from history should start here."

The book has been criticized by the controversial historical sociologist Ricardo Duchesne for offering a 'diffuse definition of the West which Morris envisions encompassing not only Europe but all civilizations descending from the Fertile Crescent, including Islam, as well as a propensity to level out fundamental differences between the development of the West and the rest, which disregards the singular role of Europe in shaping the modern world'. Morris replied, saying that "despite his review’s length, rather little of it takes on my book’s central thesis", and defending his focus on China. The notion that the Middle East and Europe are in the same system was introduced by David Wilkinson in 1987.

Sverre Bagge criticizes the book for underestimating the importance of institutional factors (such as state formation) and in downplaying cultural explanations in favor of materialist explanations.

== See also ==
- Guns, Germs, and Steel
