= Jean Kelly (disambiguation) =

Jean Louisa Kelly (born 1972) is an American actress.

Jean Kelly may also refer to:

- Jean Kelly, a participant in the Irish TV series Operation Transformation
- Jean Kelly, a character in the American TV series Grace Under Fire

== See also ==
- Gene Kelly (disambiguation)
- Jeanne Kelly (1915–1963), American actress
- Jean-Baptiste Kelly (1783–1854), Canadian Catholic priest
