= Dan Pontefract =

Canadian businessman and writer

- Education: McGill University; Royal Roads University (MBA)
- Occupations: leadership strategist, author, speaker

Dan Pontefract is a Canadian leadership and culture strategist, author and speaker.

== Early life and education ==
Pontefract is from Stoney Creek, Ontario. He earned a Bachelor of Education (BEd) in 1994 and a degree in Educational Technology in 1995 from McGill University. He received an MBA from Royal Roads University in 2002.

== Career ==
Pontefract held senior roles at the British Columbia Institute of Technology (BCIT), BusinessObjects, and SAP SE. He then served as the Chief Envisioner and Chief Learning Officer at the Canadian national telecommunications company Telus. There he launched the Telus Transformation Office to improve workplace culture and the Telus MBA, "a customized executive MBA tailored for promising employees" at University of Victoria's Peter B. Gustavson School of Business. Pontefract also serves as an adjunct professor at the business school.

In 2018, Pontefract was named to the Thinkers50 Radar list of the "30 management thinkers most likely to shape the future of how organizations are managed and led."

== Personal life ==
Pontefract is married to Denise Lamarche, a fellow alumnus of McGill.

== Publications ==
Pontefract is the author of six management books. His 2026 book, The Future of Work Is Grey, introduces the concept of "age debt". His 2023 book, Work-Life Bloom, was named one of Thinkers50 Top New Management books in 2024 as well as the Axiom Business Book Awards Gold Medal for Leadership. His 2020 book, Lead. Care. Win., won the 2022 silver medal at the Nautilus Book Awards. His 2018 book, Open to Think, won the 2019 Axiom Business Book Award silver medal in the leadership category and Open to Think also won the 2019 getAbstract International Book Award.

- The Future of Work Is Grey: The Untapped Value of Age in the Workforce. Page Two. May 2026. ISBN 978-1-77458-664-0.
- Work-Life Bloom: How to Nurture a Team That Flourishes Figure 1. September 2023. ISBN 978-1773272221.
- Lead. Care. Win.: How to Become a Leader Who Matters. Figure 1. September 2020. ISBN 978-1773271323.
- Open To Think: Slow Down, Think Creatively, and Make Better Decisions. Figure 1. September 2018. ISBN 978-1-77327-027-2.
- The Purpose Effect: Building Meaning in Yourself, Your Role and Your Organization. Elevate. May 2016. ISBN 978-1937498894.
- Flat Army: Creating a Connected and Engaged Organization. Jossey-Bass. March 2013. ISBN 978-1-118-52979-9.
