= Norbert Häring =

German economist

- Born: 1963 (age 62–63)

Academic background
- Education: University of Saarbrücken

Academic work
- Discipline: Economics

Notes
- also spelled: Norbert Haering

Norbert Häring is an economist and business journalist. Since 2002 he has reported on finance and economics for the German business newspaper Handelsblatt.

== Life ==
He is the author (with Olaf Storbeck) of the book Ökonomie 2.0 which was a bestseller in Germany and won the 2007 GetAbstract International Book Award for best business book. It was published in English as Economics 2.0 and also translated into Chinese, Korean, Italian and Japanese. His book Markt und Macht was published in English as Economists and the Powerful (with Niall Douglas) by Anthem Press in 2012. In a review for CounterPunch, economist Michael Hudson wrote that the authors "provide a wealth of references tracing how economics was turned into a propaganda exercise for financiers, landlords, monopolists, insiders, fraudsters and other rent-seeking predators."

Häring serves as non-voting chairman for the Shadow ECB Council, a group of 15 economists drawn from banks, academia, and other institutions founded in 2002 to discuss monetary policy and make recommendations to the European Central Bank. He is a co-founder and co-director of the World Economics Association and co-editor of the journal World Economic Review, both of which aim to promote a pluralistic approach to economic research.

In 2014 he was awarded the Keynes Prize for Economic Writing for his contributions to Handelsblatt.

== Books in English ==
- (co-author with Niall Douglas) Economists and the Powerful: Convenient Theories, Distorted Facts, Ample Rewards (Anthem Press, 2012) ISBN 978-0857284594
- (co-author with Olaf Storbeck) Economics 2.0: What the Best Minds in Economics Can Teach You About Business and Life (St. Martin's Press, 2008) ISBN 978-0230612433

== Books in German ==
- Die Abschaffung des Bargelds und die Folgen: Der Weg in die totale Kontrolle (Bastei Lübbe, 2016) ISBN 978-3869950884
- So funktioniert die Wirtschaft (Haufe Lexware, 2012) ISBN 978-3648025529
- Markt und Macht: Was Sie schon immer über die Wirtschaft wissen wollten, aber bisher nicht erfahren sollten (Schäffer-Poeschel, 2010) ISBN 978-3791029863
- (co-author with Olaf Storbeck) Ökonomie 2.0: 99 überraschende Erkenntnisse (Schäffer-Poeschel, 2007) ISBN 978-3791026350
- mit Niall Douglas: Economists and the Powerful. Convenient Theories, Distorted Facts, Ample Rewards. Anthem Press, London [u. a.] 2012, ISBN 978-0-85728-459-4
- Stimmt es, dass…? Respektlose Fragen zu Wirtschaftsordnung und Wirtschaftskrise. Schäffer-Poeschel, Stuttgart 2012, ISBN 978-3-7910-3269-6.
- Die Abschaffung des Bargelds und die Folgen. Quadriga-Verlag, Köln 2016, ISBN 978-3-86995-088-4.
- Schönes neues Geld: PayPal, WeChat, Amazon Go – uns droht eine totalitäre Weltwährung, Campus, Frankfurt am Main 2018, ISBN 978-3-593-50914-3.
- Endspiel des Kapitalismus. Wie die Konzerne die Macht übernahmen und wie wir sie zurückholen. Quadriga, Berlin 2021, ISBN 978-3-86995-113-3.
