= Pero Mićić =

German author

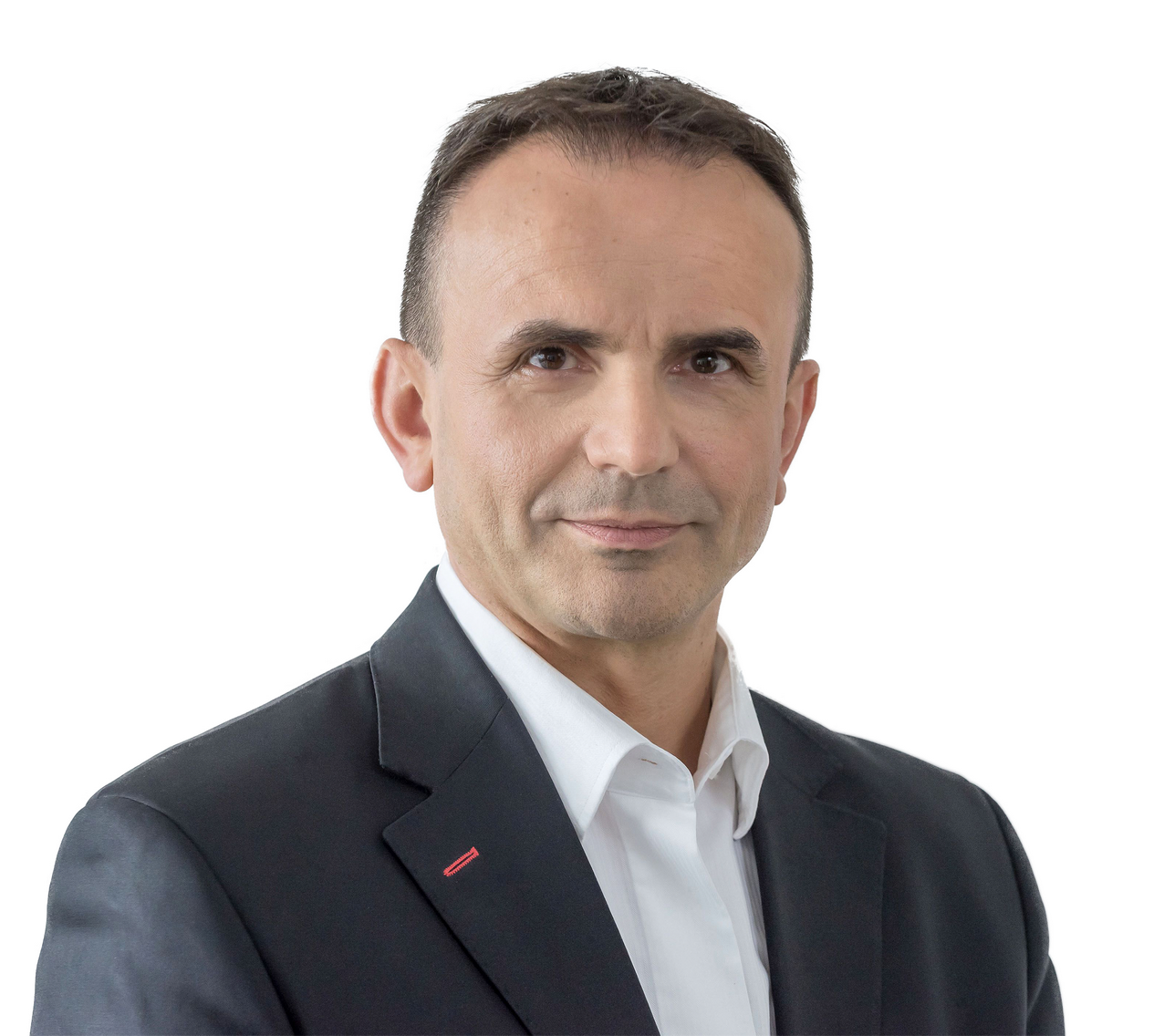

Pero Mićić (born 1967 in Belgrade) is a German professor for Foresight and Strategy at Steinbeis-Hochschule Berlin, as well as author, public speaker and management consultant. He is the founder and CEO of the FutureManagementGroup AG. Mićić lives in Eltville, Germany.

== Life ==
Pero Mićić studied economics and received his doctorate in 2007 from Leeds Business School in the United Kingdom. He speaks German, English, French, Serbian and Croatian.

== Career ==
In 1991 Mićić founded the first private company for future management consulting in the German-speaking world, today's FutureManagementGroup AG, of which he is chairman. The Frankfurter Allgemeine Zeitung states that Future Management Group ″advises the management teams and strategists of large corporations and leading medium-sized companies. His clients already included Siemens, Deutsche Bank and Lufthansa, for example″. The firm focuses on improving assumptions and translating future knowledge into concrete action based on trends and future technologies.

Mićić currently works as a consultant and lecturer, organizes seminars, and speaks at universities and conferences. He has written several books and commentaries in media such as the german Huffington Post, n-tv, and radio broadcasts. He is regarded as an expert on future management. His book The Five Futures Glasses has been translated into English, Chinese, Iranian and Korean. In addition, Mićić acted as an investor for the companies AVA Information Systems GmbH in Berlin, Inoptec Ltd. in London and Munich, and Mapegy in the area of software development and artificial intelligence. For AVA and Inoptec he also acted as an advisor. He was chairman of the supervisory board of the educational company Ibis Acam AG. Mićić was appointed professor for Foresight and Strategy at the Steinbeis-Hochschule Berlin in 2019.

=== Eltville Model ===
Mićić developed the Eltville Model of future management. It is based on five human perspectives of the future, represented by five so-called futures glasses. It differs from other strategy development models in that it also includes foresight in addition to the strategy.

== Affiliations ==
Mićić is a founding member of the Association of Professional Futurists, a member of the Advisory Board of the Foresight Program at the University of Houston, and Chairman of the International Trend and Future Management Conference. He was also Chairman of the Advisory Board of the European Futurists Conference in Lucerne. In 2017 he became a Fellow of the World Futures Studies Federation. In August 2018, Mićić was appointed by the state government in Hesse, Germany, to the Council for Digital Ethics, which was constituted on September 19, 2018 under the chairmanship of Prime Minister Volker Bouffier. The Council is to advise the government in the German state of Hesse on questions of ethics in connection with the digital transformation of society.

== Awards ==
Mićić was awarded the Strategy Prize by the German Bundesverband StrategieForum in 2012 for the outstanding implementation of a corporate strategy in the sense of the bottleneck-focused strategy, according to Wolfgang Mewes. In 2014, he received the getAbstract International Book Award at the Frankfurt Book Fair. In 2014, The Five Futures Glasses was awarded the Most Significant Futures Works prize of the Association of Professional Futurists in the category "Advancing the Methodology and Practice of Foresight and Futures Studies."

== Selected works ==
=== Books ===
- (2014) Wie wir uns täglich die Zukunft versauen – Raus aus der Kurzfrist-Falle. Berlin: Econ. ISBN 9783430201605. (in German)
- (2011) 30 Minuten Zukunftsmanagement. 5th rev. ed. Offenbach: Gabal. ISBN 9783869362878. (in German)
- (2009) Die fünf Zukunftsbrillen – Chancen früher erkennen durch praktisches Zukunftsmanagemen. 2nd ed. Offenbach: Gabal. ISBN 9783897496699. (in German)
- (2010) The Five Futures Glasses – How to See and Understand More of the Future with the Eltville Model. London: Palgrave McMillan. ISBN 9780230247055.
- (2007) Das ZukunftsRadar – Die wichtigsten Trends, Technologien und Themen der Zukunft. 2nd ed. Offenbach: Gabal. ISBN 3897495945. (in German)
- (2005) 30 Minuten für Zukunftsforschung und Zukunftsmanagement. Offenbach: Gabal. ISBN 9783897495579. (in German)
- (2003) Der ZukunftsManager – Wie Sie Marktchancen vor Ihren Mitbewerbern erkennen. 3rd ed. Freiburg: Haufe. ISBN 344805769X. (in German)

=== Audiobooks, podcasts ===
- (2018) with Heinrich, Stephan: Führen in die Zukunft: Sales-up-Call. Trier: Heinrich Management Consulting. ASIN B07JHKHHS1. (in German)
- (2011) with Kleinhenz, Susanne, et al: Erfolg-Reich-Sein in der Zukunft. Berlin: live-academy Publishers. ISBN 9783000345265. (in German)

=== Articles ===
- (2016) Lünendonk, Thomas; Lünendonk, Jonas; Dr. Canibol, Hans-Peter (eds.): Handbuch Consulting 2016: 60 führende Partner für Ihr Unternehmen. Groß-Gerau: fakten + köpfe Verlagsgesellschaft. ISBN 9783981515732. (in German)
- (2011) "Zukunftsmanagement. Mythos und Wirklichkeit." In: Naderer, Gabriele; Balzer, Eva (eds.): Qualitative Marktforschung in Theorie und Praxis: Grundlagen, Methoden und Anwendungen. 2nd ed. Heidelberg: Springer Gabler. ISBN 9783834929259, pp. 553–566. (in German)
- (2010) "Wie Menschen Zukünfte denken und gestalten". In: Burda, Hubert; Döpfner, Mathias; Hombach, Bodo, Rüttgers, Jürgen (eds.): 2020 – Gedanken zur Zukunft des Internets. Essen: Klartext Verlag. ISBN 9783837503760.
- (2010) "Developing Leaders as Futures Thinkers". In: Thorpe, Richard; Gold, Jeff; Mumford, Alan (eds.): Gower Handbook of Leadership and Management Development. 5th ed. Routledge, London and New York. ISBN 9780566088582. pp. 547–566.
- (2009) with Culjak, Stefan; et al.: Management & Führung 1: Erfolgsrezepte von Trainern und Experten. Offenbach: Jünger Medien Publishers. ISBN 9783766495105. (in German)
