= The Measure of Civilization =

- First edition
- Author: Ian Morris
- Language: English
- Subject: geography, cultural anthropology, archaeology, history
- Published: 2013 (Princeton University Press)
- Publication place: United States
- Media type: Hardcover, Paperback
- Pages: 400 pages
- ISBN: 978-0-691-15568-5 (1st edition, hardcover)

The Measure of Civilization: How Social Development Decides the Fate of Nations is a history book by the British historian Ian Morris, published in January 2013. It is the companion volume to Morris's 2010 award-winning book, Why the West Rules—For Now.

== Description ==
The book explains in details the evidence and statistical methods used to construct the social development index in Why the West Rules—For Now. The index consists of four traits: energy capture per capita, organization, information technology, and war-making capacity. Using archaeological and historical data to quantify the history of social development, the author measures the eastern and western civilizations across 15,000 years.

The International Studies Association and Social Science History Association devoted panels to discussing the book at their 2013 annual meetings. The book has been translated into Chinese.
