= D. C. Somervell =

British historian

David Churchill Somervell (16 July 1885 – 17 January 1965) was an English historian and teacher. He taught at three well-known English public schools – Repton, Tonbridge, and Benenden – and was the author of several volumes of history and the editor of well-regarded abridgements of other historians' works.

== Life and career ==
Somervell was the son of Robert Somervell, a history master and bursar at Harrow School. He was educated at Harrow and Magdalen College, Oxford. Becoming a schoolmaster himself, he taught at Repton from 1909 to 1919, with a break during the First World War, during which he served in the Ministry of Munitions. In 1919, he was appointed history master at Tonbridge School, where he remained until his retirement in 1950. In 1918, he married Dorothea, daughter of the Rev D Harford. They had one son and one daughter. After retiring from Tonbridge, he taught at the girls' school Benenden, located close to his retirement home.

In his Who's Who entry Somervell listed eleven of his books: A Short History of our Religion (1922); Disraeli and Gladstone (1925); English Thought in the Nineteenth Century (1928); The British Empire (1930); The Reign of King George the Fifth (1935); Robert Somervell of Harrow (1935); Livingstone (1936); A History of the United States (1942); A History of Tonbridge School (1947); British Politics since 1900 (1950); and Stanley Baldwin (1953).

The Reign of King George V, (2nd ed, 1936) 550pp; has wide-ranging political, social and economic coverage, 1910–35. It is online for free.

In addition to his own original writings, Somervell gained a reputation for his skill at abridging lengthy histories and other works into single volumes. His obituarist in The Times singled out a condensation and conflation of "two massive Victorian biographies of Disraeli and Gladstone into one short volume which did not deter the reader", and regarded as his best-known work his compression of Arnold J. Toynbee's ten-volume A Study of History. His abridgement of the Toynbee work was reissued in two volumes by the Oxford University Press in 1988.
