= Duchêne =

Duchêne may refer to:

== People ==
- Achille Duchêne (1866–1947), French garden designer
- Deborah Duchêne (born 1962), American film, television, and stage actress
- Denis Auguste Duchêne (1862–1950), French World War I general
- Gabrielle Duchêne (1870–1954), French feminist and pacifist
- Gilbert-Antoine Duchêne (1919–2009), French bishop of the Roman Catholic Church
- Kate Duchêne (born 1959), British actress
- Maria Duchêne (born 1884), French contralto of the Metropolitan Opera
- Marysa Baradji-Duchêne (born 1982), French épée fencer
- Matt Duchene (born 1991), Canadian ice hockey player
- Roger Duchêne (1930–2006), French biographer
- Stefanie Duchêne, former member of German gothic metal band "Flowing Tears"

== Other uses ==
- Canard-Duchêne, French champagne house

== See also ==
- María Duchén (born 1965), Bolivian journalist and politician
- Duchesne (disambiguation)
