= Jamal A. Qaiser =

Pakistani-German author and political advisor

Jamal Ahmad Qaiser
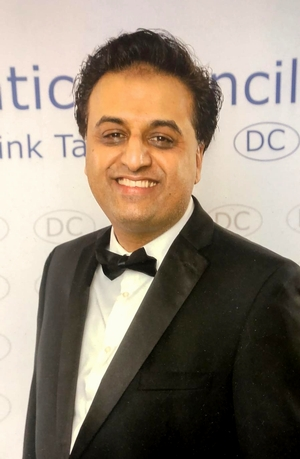
- Born: July 27, 1972 (age 54); Rawalpindi, Pakistan
- Education: University of Oxford; Harvard University
- Occupations: Author, businessman and political advisor

Jamal Ahmad Qaiser (born 27 July 1972, in Rawalpindi) is a Pakistani-German author, businessman and political advisor. Qaiser is a peace and human rights debator who represents the diplomatic council e.V at the UN's human rights councils in Geneva.

== Early life and career ==
Qaiser was born in Rawalpindi where he spent the early years of his life. Qaiser and his family immigrated to Germany when he was just eight years old.

His father sold fashion jewelry at markets in Germany and later started making digital quartz watches at the Lang & Heyne factory in Offenbach. Qaiser would often help his father after school. However, after a few years his father closed down the factory and joined the US military as a civilian.

At the age of 14, Qaiser started working as a trader in the flea markets in Frankfurt. In 1993, he started his own textile business "Qaiser Mode GmbH" that remained active until 2006, when he decided to shutdown the company. He eventually founded a real estate private equity firm.

Qaiser obtained his Advance Management Diploma (Post-Graduation) from the Globe Business College in Munich. From 2014 to 2016, he attended the Harvard Business School. He graduated from Harvard Business School with their OPM programme executive education. At University of Oxford he enrolled at the Said Business School in 2014, and graduated in 2015 with a certification in their Transition to Leadership programme.

He started advising Political Parties, NGOs, and Governmental institutions. He advised The German ministry of commerce, Islamic Republic of Pakistan, and various think tanks such as the Westerwelle foundation, American Council on Germany, NAFFO, and others.

== Writing career ==
Qaiser's first book "Der fremde Erfolgsfaktor" was published by Wiley in March 2016. The book dealt with Germany’s immigration policy. Qaiser argues in the book that Germany has to revise its immigration and integration policy by describing which obstacles have to be tackled and which decisions have to be made at the highest political level. He states in the book that Germany has no choice but to position itself more attractively for immigrants than before. Qaiser received the getAbstract International Book Award in 2016 for this book out of 10,000 non-fiction books, this award is endowed with Euro 20.000 Prize money.

In 2018, he published his second book "Mein Atomknopf ist größer" (My nuclear button is bigger: America vs. North Korea), which analyzed the conflict between the United States and North Korea.

His third book "Simmering Kashmir" , a book examining the Kashmir conflict and its impact on the region was released in December 2020. He co-authored the book with research scientist Sadaf Taimur.

Other works published by Qaiser include "How to avoid World War III" (2021), Afghanistan -The Battered Land (2022), The Western Fiasco: Failure in Afghanistan, Syria and Ukraine (2022), Wenn sich China und Russland verbünden...: Die Herausforderung der Freien Welt (When China and Russia join forces: The Challenge for the Free World),, Krieg in Europa - Unser schlimmster Albtraum: Wie Europa seine Unabhängigkeit verlor und zum Schlachtfeld wurde (War in Europe: Our worst nightmare), and "COVID-19: Falsche Pandemie:Die fatalen Fehler der WHO und ihre verhängnisvollen Folgen"(2020).
