= Henri Gabriel Duchesne =

French naturalist (1739–1822)

Henri Gabriel Duchesne (1739–1822), was a French naturalist.

== Biography ==
Duchesne was born in Paris in 1739. He and Pierre-Joseph Macquer anonymously published a Manuel du naturaliste (Paris: Desprez, 1770, reissued in 1771), and he anonymously published a Dictionnaire de l'industrie (3 volumes, 1776; 2nd edition 1795). He died in 1822.
