= E. W. F. Tomlin =

British writer

Eric Walter Frederick Tomlin CBE (30 January 1913 – 16 January 1988) was a British essayist, known mostly for many books and articles on philosophical topics.

He knew both T. S. Eliot and Wyndham Lewis, and wrote on them.

== Life ==
Tomlin was born in Croydon on 30 January 1913 and educated at Whitgift School.

He was head of the British Council in Japan from 1961 to 1967.

He was appointed an Officer of the Order of the British Empire (OBE) in 1959 and raised to Commander (CBE) in 1965.

He died in London on 16 January 1988.

== Works ==
- Turkey, the Modern Miracle (1940)
- Life in Modern Turkey (1946)
- The Approach to Metaphysics (1947)
- The Oriental Philosophers; an introduction (1950), First pub. abroad as The great philosophers: The Eastern world (1950), reprinted as Great Philosophers of the East (1959)
- The Western Philosophers; an introduction (1950), First pub. abroad as The great philosophers: The Western world (1950), reprinted as Great Philosophers of the West (1959)
- R. G. Collingwood (1953)
- Simone Weil (1954)
- Living and Knowing (1955)
- Wyndham Lewis (1955)
- La Vie et l'Oeuvre de Bertrand Russell (1963)
- T. S. Eliot : a tribute from Japan (1966) editor with Masao Hirai
- Tokyo Essays (1967)
- Charles Dickens, 1812-1870; a Centennial Volume (1969) editor
- Wyndham Lewis - An Anthology of His Prose (1969) editor
- Japan (1973)
- The Last Country: My Years in Japan (1974)
- Arnold Toynbee, a Selection From His Works (1978) editor
- The World of Saint Boniface (1981)
- The Church of St. Morwenna and St. John the Baptist: a guide and history (1982)
- In Search of Saint Piran: an account of his monastic foundation at Perranzabuloe, Cornwall (1982)
- Psyche, Culture and the New Science: the Role of PN (1985) on Psychic Nutrition (1985)
- Philosophers of East and West: The Quest for the Meaning of Existence in Eastern and Western Thought (1986)
- T. S. Eliot: A Friendship (1988)
- The Tall Trees of Marsland: reflections on life and time (1991)
