= David Wilkinson (political scientist) =

Professor of political science

David Ormond Wilkinson (born 1939) is a professor of political science at the University of California, Los Angeles.

== Education and career ==
After graduating from Harvard College with a B.A. degree in 1960, Wilkinson was admitted to Columbia University, and received his M.A. and Ph.D. degrees in 1962 and 1965.

Wilkinson joined the faculty of the UCLA Department of Political Science as an assistant professor in 1964 and became a professor in 1975. He also serves as an editor for the Comparative Civilizations Review and the Journal of World-Systems Research.

== Scholarship ==
Wilkinson redefines civilization on connectedness criterion, not cultural criterion, as "a city-state, cities-state, or tightly linked politico-military network of such states that are not a part of a larger such network", and considers civilizations as world-systems.

Wilkinson introduces the idea of "Central Civilization" or "Central World-System", which he argues emerged about 1500 BC with the integration of the Mesopotamian and Egyptian civilizations, and then engulfed the Aegean civilization in 560 BC, Indic civilization in 1000, the New World after the Age of Discovery, and finally the Far Eastern civilizations in 1850. This idea has been followed and developed by other scholars.

The notion that the Middle East and Europe are in the same system was also adopted by Ian Morris's award-winning book Why the West Rules—For Now, which defines the West as all civilizations descending from the Fertile Crescent, rather than just the traditional Western world.

== Selected bibliography ==
=== Books ===
- Malraux: An Essay in Political Criticism, Harvard University Press, 1967, ISBN 0674544005
- Comparative Foreign Relations: Framework and Methods, Dickinson Publishing Company, 1969
- Revolutionary Civil War: The Elements of Victory and Defeat, Page-Ficklin Publications, 1975
- Deadly Quarrels: Lewis F. Richardson and the Statistical Study of War, University of California Press, 1980, ISBN 0520038290

=== Articles ===
- "Power Polarity in the Far Eastern World System, 1025 BC—AD 1850: Narrative and 25-Year Interval Data", 5 Journal of World-Systems Research no.3 (Fall 1999).
- "Civilizations as Networks: Trade, War, Diplomacy, and Command-Control", 8 Complexity no.1 (September–October 2002), pp. 82–86.
