= A Study of History =

Book by Arnold J. Toynbee

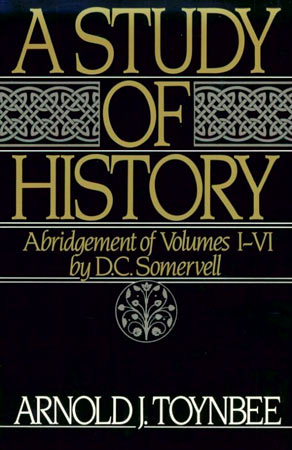
- Cover of D. C. Somervell's abridgement of A Study of History
- Author: Arnold J. Toynbee
- Language: English
- Subject: World history
- Published: 1934–1961
- Publication place: United Kingdom
- OCLC: 16276526

A Study of History is a 12-volume universal history by the British historian Arnold J. Toynbee, published from 1934 to 1961. It received enormous popular attention but according to historian Richard J. Evans, "enjoyed only a brief vogue before disappearing into the obscurity in which it has languished". Toynbee's goal was to trace the development and decay of 19 or 21 world civilizations in the historical record, applying his model to each of these civilizations, detailing the stages through which they all pass: genesis, growth, time of troubles, universal state, and disintegration.

The 19 (or 21) major civilizations, as Toynbee sees them, are: Egyptian, Andean, Sumerian, Babylonic, Hittite, Minoan, Indic, Hindu, Syriac, Hellenic, Western, Orthodox Christian (having two branches: the main or Byzantine body and the Russian branch), Far Eastern (having two branches: the main or Chinese body and the Japanese-Korean branch), Islamic (having two branches which later merged: Arabic and Iranic), Mayan, Mexican and Yucatec. Moreover, there are three "abortive civilizations" (Abortive Far Western Christian, Abortive Far Eastern Christian, Abortive Scandinavian) and five "arrested civilizations" (Polynesian, Eskimo, Nomadic, Ottoman, Spartan), for a total of 27 or 29.

== Titles of the volumes ==
The 12-volume work contains more than 3 million words and about 7,000 pages, plus 412 pages of indices.

- Publication of A Study of History
  - Vol I: Introduction: The Geneses of Civilizations, part one (Oxford University Press, 1934)
  - Vol II: The Geneses of Civilizations, part two (Oxford University Press, 1934)
  - Vol III: The Growths of Civilizations (Oxford University Press, 1934)
  - Vol IV: The Breakdowns of Civilizations (Oxford University Press, 1939)
  - Vol V: The Disintegrations of Civilizations, part one (Oxford University Press, 1939)
  - Vol VI: The Disintegrations of Civilizations, part two (Oxford University Press, 1939)
  - Vol VII: Universal States; Universal Churches (Oxford University Press, 1954) [as two volumes in paperback]
  - Vol VIII: Heroic Ages; Contacts between Civilizations in Space (Encounters between Contemporaries) (Oxford University Press, 1954)
  - Vol IX: Contacts between Civilizations in Time (Renaissances); Law and Freedom in History; The Prospects of the Western Civilization (Oxford University Press, 1954)
  - Vol X: The Inspirations of Historians; A Note on Chronology (Oxford University Press, 1954)
  - Vol XI: Historical Atlas and Gazetteer (Oxford University Press, 1959)
  - Vol XII: Reconsiderations (Oxford University Press, 1961)
- Abridgements by D. C. Somervell:
  - A Study of History: Abridgement of Vols I–VI, with a preface by Toynbee (Oxford University Press, 1946)
  - A Study of History: Abridgement of Vols VII–X (Oxford University Press, 1957)
  - A Study of History: Abridgement of Vols I–X in One Volume, with new preface by Toynbee & new tables (Oxford Univ. Press, 1960)
- Abridgement by the author and Jane Caplan:
  - A Study of History: The Abridged One-Volume Edition, with new foreword by Toynbee & a new chapter (Oxford University Press and Thames & Hudson, 1972)

== Genesis and Growth ==
Toynbee argues that civilizations are born out of more primitive societies, not as the result of racial or environmental factors, but as a response to challenges, such as hard country, new ground, blows and pressures from other civilizations, and penalization. He argues that for civilizations to be born, the challenge must be a golden mean; that excessive challenge will crush the civilization, and too little challenge will cause it to stagnate. He argues that civilizations continue to grow only when they meet one challenge only to be met by another, in a continuous cycle of "Challenge and Response". He argues that civilizations develop in different ways due to their different environments and different approaches to the challenges they face. He argues that growth is driven by "Creative Minorities": those who find solutions to the challenges, who inspire (rather than compel) others to follow their innovative lead. This is done through the "faculty of mimesis." Creative minorities find solutions to the challenges a civilization faces, while the great mass follow these solutions by imitation, solutions they otherwise would be incapable of discovering on their own.

In 1939, Toynbee wrote,

"The challenge of being called upon to create a political world-order, the framework for an economic world-order ... now confronts our Modern Western society."

== Breakdown and Disintegration ==
Toynbee does not see the breakdown of civilizations as caused by loss of control over the physical environment, by loss of control over the human environment, or by attacks from outside. Rather, it comes from the deterioration of the "Creative Minority", which eventually ceases to be creative and degenerates into merely a "Dominant Minority".

He argues that creative minorities deteriorate due to a worship of their "former self", by which they become prideful and fail adequately to address the next challenge they face.

== Results of the breakdown ==
The final breakdown results in "positive acts of creation;" the dominant minority seeks to create a Universal state to preserve its power and influence, and the internal proletariat seeks to create a Universal church to preserve its spiritual values and cultural norms.

=== Universal state ===
Toynbee argues that the ultimate sign a civilization has broken down is when the dominant minority forms a "universal state", which stifles political creativity within the existing social order. The classic example of this is the Roman Empire, though many other imperial regimes are cited as examples. Toynbee writes:

"First the Dominant Minority attempts to hold by force—against all right and reason—a position of inherited privilege which it has ceased to merit; and then the Proletariat repays injustice with resentment, fear with hate, and violence with violence. Yet the whole movement ends in positive acts of creation. The Dominant Minority creates a universal state, the Internal Proletariat a universal church, and the External Proletariat a bevy of barbarian war-bands."

=== Universal church ===
Toynbee developed his concept of an "internal proletariat" and an "external proletariat" to describe quite different opposition groups within and outside the frontiers of a civilization. These groups, however, find themselves bound to the fate of the civilization. During its decline and disintegration, they are increasingly disenfranchised or alienated, and thus lose their immediate sense of loyalty or of obligation. Nonetheless an "internal proletariat", untrusting of the dominant minority, may form a "universal church" which survives the civilization's demise, co-opting the useful structures such as marriage laws of the earlier time while creating a new philosophical or religious pattern for the next stage of history.

Before the process of disintegration, the dominant minority had held the internal proletariat in subjugation within the confines of the civilization, causing these oppressed to grow bitter. The external proletariat, living outside the civilization in poverty and chaos, grows envious. Then, in the social stress resulting from the failure of the civilization, the bitterness and envy increase markedly.

Toynbee argues that as civilizations decay, there is a "schism" within the society. In this environment of discord, people resort to archaism (idealization of the past), futurism (idealization of the future), detachment (removal of oneself from the realities of a decaying world), and transcendence (meeting the challenges of the decaying civilization with new insight, e.g., by following a new religion). From among members of an "internal proletariat" who transcend the social decay a "church" may arise. Such an association would contain new and stronger spiritual insights, around which a subsequent civilization may begin to form. Toynbee here uses the word "church" in a general sense, e.g., to refer to a collective spiritual bond found in common worship, or the unity found in an agreed social order.

== Predictions ==
It remains to be seen what will come of the four remaining civilizations of the 21st century: Western civilization, Islamic society, Hindu civilization, and the Far East. Toynbee argues two possibilities: they might all merge with Western Civilization, or Western civilization might develop a 'Universal State' after its 'Time of Troubles', decay, and die.

== List of civilizations ==
The following table lists the 23 civilizations identified by Toynbee in vol. Vii. This table does not include what Toynbee terms primitive societies, arrested civilizations, or abortive civilizations. Civilizations are shown in boldface. Toynbee's "Universal Churches" are written in italic and are chronologically located between second- and third- generation civilizations, as is described in volume VII.

**1st Generation**	**2nd Generation**	**Universal Church**	**3rd Generation**
**Minoan**	**Hellenic** (Greek and Roman)	Christian	**Western**; **Orthodox-Russian**; **Orthodox-Byzantine**
**Minoan**	**Syriac Society** (Ancient Israel, Phoenicia etc.)	Islam	**Islamic** (at early stages divided into **Iranian** and **Arabic**, civilizations, which later were unified)
**Shang**	**Sinic** (see also Han dynasty)	Mahayana (Buddhism)	**Chinese**; **Japanese**-**Korean** ("Far Eastern")
**Indus**	**Indic**	Hinduism	**Hindu**
**Egyptiac**		-	-
**Sumeric**	**Hittite**; **Babylonian**	-	-
**Andean**; **Mayan**; **Yucatec**; **Mexican**		-	-

== Reception ==
Historian Carroll Quigley expanded upon Toynbee's notion of civilizational collapse in The Evolution of Civilizations (1961, 1979). He argued that societal disintegration involves the metamorphosis of social instruments, set up to meet actual needs, into institutions, which serve their own interest at the expense of social needs.

Social scientist Ashley Montagu assembled 29 other historians' articles to form a symposium on Toynbee's A Study of History, published as Toynbee and History: Critical Essays and Reviews. The book includes three of Toynbee's own essays: "What I am Trying to Do" (originally published in International Affairs vol. 31, 1955); What the Book is For: How the Book Took Shape (a pamphlet written upon completion of the final volumes of A Study of History) and a comment written in response to the articles by Edward Fiess and Pieter Geyl (originally published in Journal of the History of Ideas, vol. 16, 1955.)

David Wilkinson suggests that there is an even larger unit than civilisation. Using the ideas drawn from "World Systems Theory" he suggests that since at least 1500 BC that there was a connection established between a number of formerly separate civilisations to form a single interacting "Central Civilisation", which expanded to include formerly separate civilisations such as India, the Far East, and eventually Western Europe and the Americas into a single "World System". In some ways, it resembles what William H. McNeill calls the "Closure of the Eurasian Ecumene, 500 B.C.-200 A.D."

=== Legacy ===
After 1960, Toynbee's ideas faded both in academia and the media, to the point of seldom being cited today. Toynbee's approach to history, his style of civilizational analysis, faced skepticism from mainstream historians who thought it put an undue emphasis on the divine. Nor could social scientists of theoretical and quantitative research profit from the Study. For long time they waited for an historian who would approach history in a comparative mood, but when Rein Taagepera approached Toynbee’s pioneering work with great expectations, he found "neither operational methods to emulate nor specific results to cite or compare". Taagepera tried to find at least some estimates of various phases "and came up with a blank". The scheme – civilizations – was so loose that anything conceivable would fit. Toynbee barely tried to measure any of its aspects and, hence, did not have to face quantitative inconsistencies

Toynbee's Study remained popular outside academia, where interest revived decades later with the publication of The Clash of Civilizations (1997) by political scientist Samuel P. Huntington. Huntington viewed human history as broadly the history of civilizations and posited that the world after the end of the Cold War will be a multi-polar one of competing major civilizations divided by "fault lines".

In popular culture, Toynbee's theories of historical cycles and civilisational collapse are said to have been a major inspiration for Isaac Asimov's seminal science-fiction novels, the Foundation series.

=== Jews and Armenians as a "fossil society" ===
In the introduction of his work Toynbee refers to a number of "fossilized relics" of societies, among others he mentions the Armenians, who according to Toynbee played a similar role to that of the Jews in the world of Islam.

"...and yet another Syriac remnant, the Armenian Gregorian Monophysites, have played much the same part in the World of Islam."

Volume 1 of the book, written in the 1930s, contains a discussion of Jewish culture which begins with the sentence

"There remains the case where victims of religious discrimination represent an extinct society which only survives as a fossil. .... by far the most notable is one of the fossil remnants of the Syriac Society, the Jews."

That sentence has been the subject of controversy, and some reviewers have interpreted the line as antisemitic (notably after 1945). In later printings, a footnote was appended which read

"Mr. Toynbee wrote this part of the book before the Nazi persecution of the Jews opened a new and terrible chapter of the story...".

The subject is extensively debated with input from critics in Vol XII, Reconsiderations, published in 1961.
