= Richard L. Gage =

American historian

Richard Lee Gage (born March 6, 1934, Washington) is an American historian. He specializes in Japanese history and the history of warfare.

== Bibliography ==
- Peace Is Our Duty: Accounts of What War Can Do To Man
- Women Against War: Personal Accounts of Forty Japanese Women
- Choose Hope: Your Role in Waging Peace in the Nuclear Age
- Letters of Four Seasons
