= Marie-Antoinette Duchesne =

French book publisher (c.1713 – 1793)

- Born: Marie-Antoinette Cailleau c.1713 Paris, France
- Died: 25 May 1793
- Occupation(s): Bookseller, publisher
- Spouse: Nicolas-Bonaventure Duchesne

Marie-Antoinette (or Marie Antoinette) Cailleau Duchesne (after 1713 – 1793) was an 18th-century bookseller and publisher in Paris, France. In 1767, Voltaire used a commonly used phrase when he called her, "the exact and shrewd widow Duchesne."

== Life and work ==
Marie-Antoinette was born in Paris, the daughter of André Cailleau and Antoinette Pérette Huguier, after 1713. As a child, she became familiar with the world of publishing by way of her father, maternal grandfather, Charles Huguier, and brother, André-Charles Cailleau, all publishers and booksellers.

She married Nicolas-Bonaventure Duchesne on 28 April 1747, a merchant who had traveled to Paris from the Cotentin Peninsula, in Normandy, to find work with various book vendors. With his marriage to Marie-Antoinette, the daughter of a master bookseller, Duchesne was received into the Paris community and took over André Cailleau's successful bookshop. Duchesne went on to develop a very active publishing policy favoring theater and literature, the publication of famous authors such as Voltaire and Rousseau, and the publication of almanacs and periodicals. When Duchesne died on 4 July 1765, Marie-Antoinette took over the business on Rue Saint-Jacques, and became the publisher and retail bookseller in her own right. She became widely known as "Widow Duchesne."

=== Bookseller ===
While she cared for her three minor children, she steered the business with the help of clerk, Pierre Guy until 1775, and then with her secretary André Defer de Maisonneuve. Following her late husband's publishing policy she expanded the shop's collection of plays and regularly published catalogues or notice sheets announcing her publications. She also became known as a fierce defender her rights against competitors such as Louis de Lesbros de La Versane, an author who had ventured to publish a work entitled l'Esprit de Marivaux in 1769. "The widow Duchesne, considering that this publication infringed on her privilege of publishing the writer's works, and although Louis de Lesbros had offered her three hundred copies of the work as compensation, demanded five hundred and threatened to appeal to the King's Privy Council, the jurisdiction responsible for disputes relating to royal privileges, to obtain satisfaction."

At Chez la Veuve Duchesne (House of the Widow Duchesne), she offered an extensive list of works for sale and in the course of her business she met with many other booksellers in France and abroad. She also maintained contacts with numerous authors. She became a regular correspondent with Voltaire on the occasion of the publication of a new edition of his Œuvres de Théâtre in 1767. She also worked regularly with Rétif de la Bretonne, who sold his works through her enterprise. During the French Revolution, her bookshop hosted literary events for playwrights and authors including Collot d'Herbois, Fabre d'Églantine and Olympe de Gouges.

Her commercial success allowed Widow Duchesne to acquire wealth and property in Paris. For example, she acquired the house adjoining hers on rue Saint-Jacques in 1780, then built a country house in the village of Saint-Mandé after 1783. Not surprisingly, she was taxed at high poll tax rates in her professional community. Her exceptional qualities as a businesswoman became evident again with the successful marriages of her two daughters. She arranged the 1769 marriage of her eldest, Marie Antoinette to Nicolas Defer, an engineer and contractor of the king's farms. Her youngest, Charlotte Antoinette, married Jean Colombier, a doctor regent of the Faculty of Medicine in Paris, in 1771.

The Widow Duchesne remained at the head of the company even after her son Jean Nicolas Duchesne (1757–1845) came of age. Traditionally, he would have assumed full control of the enterprise at that time, but she worked in partnership with him from 1787 until she died on 25 May 1793.

=== Legacy ===
During her professional career, which spanned almost 30 years, Marie-Antoinette Duchesne ran one of the most dynamic publishing houses of the time. According to one source, "Her family connections and her ability to surround herself with valuable collaborators apparently reinforced her personal talents that were recognized in her circles. She was referred to as a 'gossip-master' by bookstore inspector Joseph d'Hémery in 1752. In 1767, Voltaire wrote that she was 'the exact and shrewd widow Duchesne.'"
