= Ricardo Duchesne =

Canadian historical sociologist

- Born: Puerto Rico
- Education: York University
- Scientific career
- Fields: Historical sociologist
- Workplaces: University of New Brunswick

Ricardo Duchesne is a Puerto Rican-born Canadian historical sociologist and was until 2019 a professor at the University of New Brunswick's Saint John campus. His main research interests are Western civilization, the rise of the West, and multiculturalism. Duchesne's views on immigration and multiculturalism are considered to be racist, white supremacist and white nationalist.

== Life and career ==
Duchesne was born in Puerto Rico. His mother, Coralie Tattersall Duchesne, was a British citizen of English descent born in Kolkata, India; his father, Juan Duchesne Landrón, was a medical doctor of Afro-Puerto Rican (Caribbean) and French heritage. His parents met when his mother was studying at the Sorbonne; they were wed in Tangier, had three children while living in Madrid, and three more, including Ricardo, after they moved to Puerto Rico in 1956. His parents divorced in 1970 and Ricardo Duchesne's mother immigrated to Montreal, where she became active in the local cultural scene as an actress and playwright. He immigrated and joined her there in the mid-1970s when he was 15 years old. In Montreal he studied history at McGill University, and later at Concordia University under the supervision of George Rudé. In 1995, he received a doctorate in Social & Political Thought at York University for his 1994 dissertation, "All Contraries Confounded: Historical Materialism and the Transition-to-Capitalism Debate", and was appointed assistant professor in the department of social science at the University of New Brunswick's Saint John (UNBSJ) campus. He took an early retirement from his position in 2019, following complaints of racism and hate speech.

Ricardo Duchesne is married to the dance choreographer Georgia Rondos. They have two children.

== Writing ==
Duchesne's first book, The Uniqueness of Western Civilization, published in 2011, criticizes the work of world historians such as Immanuel Wallerstein and Andre Gunder Frank, who he argues portray history in terms that support the egalitarian idea that all cultures are equally significant, devaluing Western civilization and its contributions in the process. Duchesne challenges historians, such as Kenneth Pomeranz and Roy Bin Wong, whose work posits Chinese economic and intellectual pre-eminence prior to 1800, and maintains that the culture of the West has always been "in a state of variance from the world" at least since classical antiquity, characterized by successive revolutions and continuous creativity in all fields of human endeavor. He traces the West's restlessness and creative spirit to what he considers to be the unique aristocratic culture of Indo-Europeans, characterized by an ethos of heroic individualism, relatively weak kinship ties, war bands bound together by voluntary oaths of loyalty and fraternity, skilled horse-riding and the use of wheeled vehicles such as chariots.

Martin Hewson, politics and international studies professor at the University of Regina, points to The Uniqueness of Western Civilization as the leading book in what he describes as a trend toward "post-multicultural history". Hewson states that "The main achievement of post-multicultural world history is to have established that there were numerous critical non-economic divergences between Europe and other regions. The West was both peculiar and inventive across many domains." David Northrup noted that "although The Uniqueness of Western Civilization may well upset or infuriate world historians, they have much to gain from reading it, since it presents summaries and critiques of a great many works in comparative world, European, and Asian history." However, he found the book "deliberately and openly tendentious" and, assessing how the various elements of the argument presented in the book fit together, concluded that the book's effort at “[s]tringing all of these pieces together coherently is more imaginative than persuasive". Steve Balch, director of the Institute for the Study of Western Civilization at Texas Tech University, said "The Uniqueness of Western Civilization is old-school scholarship at its best: consequential, closely reasoned, richly evidenced, and professionally courteous." Thomas D. Hall, although critical of the book in many respects and finding that it "gives a sense of pontificating from on high", concludes that "despite my stylistic critiques [it] shows a very wide range of scholarship and many deft syntheses. It is an impressive book." Eric Jones' review considered the book to excel in its analysis and critique of other scholars, while pointing out that Duchesne's "method, like that of the revisionists [whom Duchesne criticizes], owes too much to Marxist-style rhetoric". He expressed doubt concerning Duchesne's thesis attributing the progress of the West to aristocratic competitiveness inherited from “invading, prestige-hungry Indo-European steppe nomads”, saying that “these hoary, contentious themes are really several orders of magnitude more speculative than the tracts of early modern history where Duchesne fences with the most fashionable of the revisionists." Christopher Beckwith has argued that there was never any European group that had the characteristics Duchesne attributes to such Indo-European nomads, suggesting that in this respect Duchesne's theory "simply will not stand up to careful historical analysis". Peter Turchin, while considering the book "interesting and thought-provoking", criticized it for "allowing ideology to drive the agenda" and also noting serious methodological issues that he claimed the book shared with other scholarly work in the field.

Scholars of Asian history had particular concerns about the work. Mark Elvin, a professor of Chinese history, describes Uniqueness in the Canadian Journal of Sociology as an "alpha-delta book - with some very good and some unnervingly bad components." He expresses doubt about Duchesne's theses and notes that Duchesne lacks the familiarity with non-Western history and cultures that would be needed to do the kind of comparative work that the book professes to contain. A review by Geetanjali Srikantan, a historian of India, is more critical than Elvin's, criticizing his reliance on a non-representative set of secondary sources and pointing out that "non-Western theorists" are not analyzed in the text. She asserts that Duchesne fails to provide “a coherent description of Western culture”, maintaining that the connection Duchesne draws between Western predominance and the ancient “‘aristocratic warlike culture’ of the Indo-Europeans” rests on shaky ground because the definition of Western culture offered by Duchesne is so vague. She observes that the book contains factual "discrepancies that one does not expect in an academic text" and concludes that "It is clearly alarming that such scholarship has had positive reviews."

Uniqueness was placed on the neo-Nazi internet site Stormfront's 2011 list of "books recommended for white nationalists." Kevin McDonald, an evolutionary psychologist and white supremacist known for his antisemitic conspiracy theories, wrote a 22-page review in which he praised the book as "a brilliant work written by an exceptionally wide-ranging scholar and thinker." McDonald would go on to publish much of Duchesne's subsequent work in The Occidental Quarterly, which McDonald edits. Gerald Russello, writing in The Dorchester Review, praised "Duchesne's marshalling of enormous amounts of data and his obviously wide reading...", asserting that "His thesis about the Indo-Europeans and the differences he perceives between the West and other cultures is based on solid historical and archeological research".

In a review in the journal The European Legacy, right-wing academic Grant Havers wrote that Duchesne "brings to his study an erudition that is matched only by Marx, Spengler, and Voegelin. Ricardo Duchesne demonstrates his mastery of anthropology, philosophy, religion, economics, and especially world history". Havers also criticised Duchesne's work for attributing the prominence of the West to an aristocratic "Nietzschian ideal of pagan greatness" and for de-emphasising the importance of Christianity, which Havers sees as the "founding faith" of the West, "whose egalitarianism in undermining aristocratic pride made the modern democratic West possible".

=== Subsequent work ===
In mid-2014, he created the blog "Council of European Canadians" with the stated purpose that "Canada should remain majority, not exclusively, European in its ethnic composition and cultural character [because] Canada is a nation created by individuals with an Anglo/French-European heritage, not by individuals from diverse races and cultures." Legal scholar Amy Lai describes Duchesne's Twitter account as "race-obsessed", stating that "In fact, Duchesne never hides his racial politics in his social media posts, which are consistently dripping with his obsession with skin color and the superiority of the white race." Jonathan Turcotte-Summers has described him as a "race war advocate." Duchesne has denied being a racist to the mainstream press, but has nonetheless become more comfortable with white identity politics in the articles he writes for his blog. After he founded the blog, the views he expressed in it began to seep into his classroom and lectures, giving rise to complaints from students and other faculty members.

Duchesne claims, in his book Canada in Decay: Mass Immigration, Diversity, and the Ethnocide of Euro-Canadians (2017), to support white identity politics, within the constitutional framework of Canadian multiculturalism. A critic of the overall philosophy of multiculturalism and of immigration to Canada, Duchesne shares with white nationalism the belief that "Euro-Canadians" should maintain both a demographic majority and dominance of Canada's culture and public life. He has shown support for white nationalism, including by providing a positive endorsement and cover blurb for a book entitled The White Nationalist Manifesto. He has appeared as a featured guest on various white supremacist media outlets and he spoke at a forum of the National Citizens Alliance, a fringe political party known for its advocacy of white nationalism and far-right conspiracy theories.

Duchesne's 2017 book, Faustian Man In A Multi-Cultural Age (portions of which had been first published in the white nationalist magazine The Occidental Quarterly), further advanced the presence of white nationalism in Duchesne's writing, connecting his assertions about the uniqueness of the Western spirit to theories about the genetic characteristics of European man. Whereas his first book had been published by an academic press, this one was published by Arktos Media, a frequent distributor of far-right extremist writing, described as "an obvious and committed alt-right publishing company". In the preface and first chapters of the book Duchesne describes himself as following an intellectual journey from liberal preconceptions of racial equality to explicit avowal of Western race-based identity. The first chapter credits this transformation in part to “visiting… forbidden places”, listing the names of a series of journals and websites associated with white nationalism, neo-Nazism and the alt-right.

In his other 2017 book, Canada in Decay: Mass Immigration, Diversity, and the Ethnocide of Euro-Canadians, he argues that Canada is not a "nation of immigrants" but a nation created by Anglo and French pioneers and settlers. The book questions what Duchesne argues are double standards of multiculturalism in granting both collective ethnic rights and individual rights to minorities and immigrant groups while, in his view, suppressing the ethno-cultural rights of Canadians of European descent. Amy Lai points out that Canada in Decay goes beyond simply saying that "the culture of the founding Europeans is superior". In her evaluation, the message of the book is "that the influx of racial and ethnic minorities will lead to the 'ethnocide' of Euro-Canadians and Canada’s 'decay' and that minority immigrants cannot integrate, embrace the strengths of Canadian cultures, and contribute to Canadian society due to their race or ethnicity.... [Duchesne] promotes his own racial politics according to which Euro(white)-Canadians, by virtue of their skin color, are superior to other races and ethnicities, and their dominance is necessary to stop Canada from falling into 'decay.' "

== Public activities, controversy, and retirement ==
=== Vancouver controversy ===
In a May 26, 2014 blogpost, Duchesne criticized a motion of the Vancouver council to investigate discriminatory policies imposed on Chinese immigrants in the city before 1947 as an exercise in manipulating "white guilt", claiming they have "the goal of taking Canada away from the Europeans and transforming the nation into a multicultural and multiracial society." He attacked one city councillor, Kerry Jang, personally, saying that Jang "is exploiting White ideas to advance the ethnic interests of the Chinese, utilizing the same white guilt our educational institutions inflict on White children.” Duchesne sent an email to Jang and other Vancouver City councilors of Asian descent containing a link to the blogpost; he has acknowledged that he did so in order to provoke them, saying he “wanted a debate”. The comments in the blogpost then sparked controversy with Jang saying he was shocked that the city council's move would be taken this way, that he considered Duchesne's comments to be hate speech, and that "I don't think he should be teaching." In a follow-up post, Duchesne responded by saying about Chinese Canadians: “We are thus talking about a very powerful demographic group that also happens to be very wealthy with deep ingrained connections to Communist China. This group has been allowed to alter radically the formerly elegant, serene, community-oriented, British city of Vancouver, turning it into a loud, congested Asian city (still attractive only because of the architectural and institutional legacy of past white generations).” His remarks prompted an op-ed piece in The Globe and Mail which stated that Professor Duchesne "glorifies scholarship and writing that fuels xenophobia and provides fodder for white supremacy. Mr. Duchesne is a unicultural ideologue... [whose] rants are an apostasy to sociological thinking."

Jang, himself a tenured professor at the University of British Columbia, had filed a complaint in 2014 with the president of Duchesne's university asserting that Duchesne's emails to him and blog posts were “troublesome in that they go beyond fair comment and abuse the privilege of academic freedom in their pejorative nature that is based on poor scholarship”. In the complaint, he also advised that as a result of Duchesne's blog posts he had received “white supremacist” emails from readers of Duchesne's blog. Addressing the complaint, the University of New Brunswick publicly defended Duchesne's right to express his views, but also prohibited Duchesne from using the university's name or his university affiliation when expressing his political opinions on his blog or in emails. The university advised Jang, the city councillor whom Duchesne had attacked, that Duchesne would not be allowed to use his university affiliation to encourage people to read his posts about race matters and that the university would look at Duchesne's courses to ensure that he presented a balanced and scholarly perspective. Duchesne had been reprimanded by the university in response to at least one complaint made to them regarding posts on the Council of European Canadians blog.

=== Public lectures and criticism ===
In September 2015, Duchesne made statements to the Toronto Star newspaper supporting the creation of white student unions on Toronto campuses and criticizing "what he called a double standard in the media and academia against white and European pride". In response, ten colleagues of Duchesne, professors from the sociology department of the University of New Brunswick, penned an open letter to the newspaper stating "categorically that we reject Dr. Duchesne’s expressed views on 'Western civilization' and consider them void of academic merit."

In June 2017, Duchesne was the guest of honor at a private speaking event held by a Montreal alt-right group, according to people who were at or organized the meeting. The group was the Montreal branch of the Daily Stormer Book Club, started by neo-Nazi Gabriel Sohier Chaput as part of his efforts to organize a network of white supremacists. Chaput was a frequent contributor to the far-right website The Daily Stormer under the pseudonym "Charles Zeiger," writing more than 800 articles for the site in the years 2016 and 2017, one of which, published in 2017, led to his criminal conviction in 2023 for the crime of wilful promotion of hatred. In response to inquiries from journalists, Duchesne has acknowledged speaking at an event in Montreal in the summer of 2017, but denied that the group which invited him identified as "alt-right" and stated that he would never speak at a meeting organized by the neo-Nazi website The Daily Stormer.

Soon after the book club meeting, Sohier-Chaput and two other members of the group Alt-Right Montreal helped organize “Leafensraum”, a gathering in rural Southern Ontario of about 40 high-level neo-Nazis from across Canada, including a delegation that drove in from Duchesne's home province of New Brunswick, held from July 21 to July 24, 2017. Observers of far-right movements in Canada believe that Duchesne was the otherwise-anonymous university professor who is known to have given a talk at the Leafensraum gathering followed by a lengthy question and answer session about the future of their movement and his experiences in the university environment.

In the Spring of 2018, Duchesne was invited to lecture at the University of Waterloo together with Faith Goldy, a journalist associated with the alt-right and ideas of white supremacy. The invitation to them came from a student group co-founded by Lindsay Shepherd. Goldy's participation in the event drew strong protest and it was cancelled after Waterloo police advised the university that ever-increasing security costs for the event would reach $28,500.00.

The event was scheduled at the end of an academic year in which far-right speakers and groups had been challenging the limits of free speech on college campuses in the United States by scheduling provocative and highly publicized speeches and events, compelling colleges and universities to spend millions of dollars in security fees alone. Shannon Dea, who was vice-president of the Faculty Association of the University of Waterloo at the time, expressed concern that the Duchesne/Goldy event was one of a series of "repeated efforts by fringe groups to lay traps for universities by organizing on-campus events featuring speakers calculated to provoke a response," through which the organizers benefit from the prestige of the university if it is held but can claim they are victimized by excessive "political correctness" if it is not. The Faculty Association chose not to object to the holding of the event, responding instead by using it as an occasion to fundraise for university groups devoted to Indigenous, racialized, and international students.

Duchesne stirred further controversy by appearing as a guest on Faith Goldy's podcast.

Upon the invitation of UBC Students For Academic Freedom, Ricardo Duchesne gave a lecture at the University of British Columbia in the Fall of 2018, introduced by Lindsay Shepherd, entitled "Critical Reflections on Canadian Multiculturalism", in which he asserted the right of "Euro-Canadians" to "white identity politics" within the framework of Canada's official multiculturalism. While visiting Vancouver to present the lecture, Duchesne courted controversy and publicity, walking around the university campus together with a camerawoman and challenging random passers-by to debate him on immigration, gay rights and the merits of a white ethnostate.

In May 2019, Duchesne was indirectly linked to an attempt that had been made to embarrass the People's Party of Canada, a fringe right-wing Canadian political party. Fake emails containing explicitly racist content were sent out, in the names of two senior party executives, to a former party member who had quit in protest against what he had considered to be the party's racist turn, apparently with the intention that the recipient would then publicize the disturbing messages. Some of the suspect content of the emails, falsely attributed to the two executive officers, was plagiarized from actual posts made by Ricardo Duchesne on his Council of European Canadians website. The webpage by Duchesne from which the content was copied has since been deleted from the Council of European Canadians blog.

On October 9, 2019, Ricardo Duchesne and Mark Hecht spoke on the UBC-Vancouver campus at an event hosted by a group called UBC Students for Freedom of Expression. The event, titled "Academic Freedom to Discuss the Impact of Immigrant Diversity", was met by dozens of protesters claiming that the university should not give a platform to far right hate speech.

=== Investigation and retirement ===
In May 2019, The University of New Brunswick announced that it would review further complaints related to Duchesne's public comments and views on race after it was reported that he had written blog posts alleging that immigration was part of a conspiracy to advance white genocide. A group of over 100 of Duchesne's colleagues at the University of New Brunswick signed an open letter of complaint stating that Duchesne's blog posts, and even at times his classroom teachings, had no merit and qualified as hate speech that should not be protected by university policies of academic freedom. The Canadian Historical Association also wrote a letter denouncing Duchesne's work in similar terms. In response, Duchesne stated that the signatories did not have "any scholarly background" in immigration or multiculturalism, and that the charge of racism "has been overused beyond reason...and is used against anyone who questions this diversity." His response was disputed, as at least two of the signatories did specialize in aspects of multiculturalism and immigration to Canada. Mark Mercer, president of the Society for Academic Freedom and Scholarship, questioned the school's decision to review Duchesne, and argued that Duchesne's position at the university should be protected in the name of academic freedom.

The following month, on June 4, 2019, the university announced that Duchesne was taking early retirement. The terms of his settlement with them prohibit him from speaking publicly about the circumstances leading to his retirement.

Duchesne had stopped publishing in mainstream academic journals even before his retirement. Since then, he has continued his research and writing as an independent scholar, publishing articles on his Council of Euro-Canadians blog and in Kevin McDonald's white nationalist journal, The Occidental Quarterly. More recently, he published an extended review of Joseph Henrich's book The WEIRDest People In the World, in Mankind Quarterly, a pseudoscientific journal that has been described as a "cornerstone of the scientific racism establishment", a "white supremacist journal", and "a pseudo-scholarly outlet for promoting racial inequality".

== Bibliography ==
- "Defending the Rise of Western Culture Against its Multicultural Critics," The European Legacy: Toward New Paradigms (2005) 10#5, pp. 455–484. online
- The Uniqueness of Western Civilization. Studies in Critical Social Sciences. Vol. 28. Leiden and Boston: Brill. 2011. ISBN 978-90-04-19461-8.
- Faustian Man in a Multicultural Age. Arktos. 2017. ISBN 978-1-910524-84-8.
- Canada in Decay: Mass Immigration, Diversity, and the Ethnocide of Euro-Canadians. Black House Publishing. 2017. ISBN 978-1-910881-93-4.
- Greatness and Ruin: Self-Reflection and Universalism within European Civilization. Antelope Hill Publishing. 2025. ISBN 979-8-89252-030-0.
