= GetAbstract =

Content-summarizing service

getAbstract
- getAbstract logo
- Company type: Management-owned
- Industry: Knowledge compression
- Founded: 1999
- Founder: Thomas Bergen, Patrick Brigger, Rolf Dobelli
- Headquarters: Lucerne, Switzerland
- Key people: Thomas Bergen, CEO; Patrick Brigger, Chairman
- Products: Business book summaries
- Website: getabstract.com

GetAbstract, founded in 1999, is a Swiss and US-based corporation that summarizes books, videos, articles, and other content for business customers.

The summaries are available in English, German, Spanish, Russian, Chinese, French and Portuguese.

getAbstract was co-founded in 1999 by Thomas Bergen, Patrick Brigger, and Rolf Dobelli. getAbstract employs business journalists to create its content.

getAbstract is not affiliated with any publishing house, however, it does have a network of more than 500 publishing partners.
