= Ian Morris (historian) =

British historian and archaeologist

Ian M. Morris
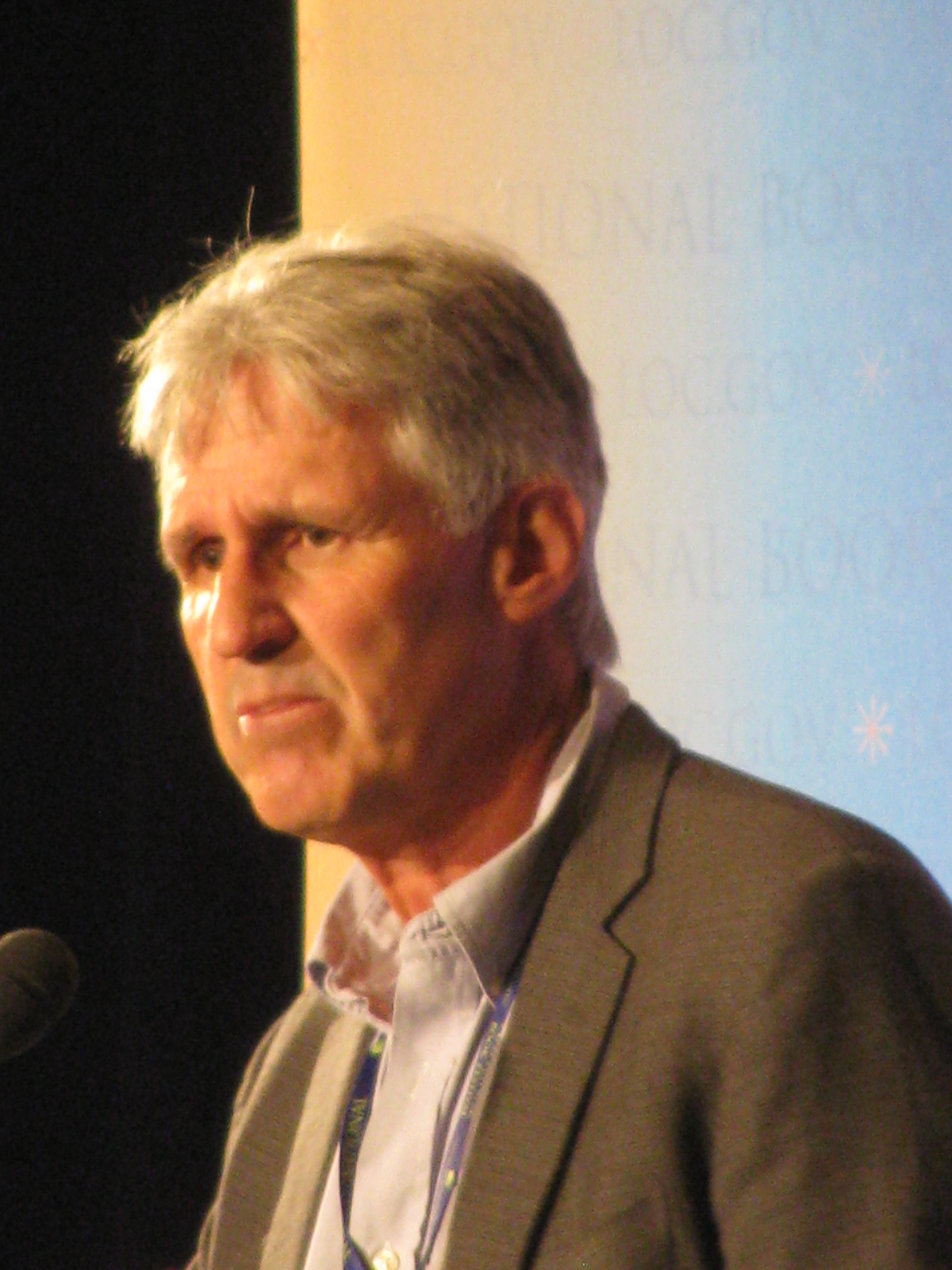
- Morris in 2014
- Born: 27 January 1960 (age 66); Stoke-on-Trent, Staffordshire, England
- Occupations: Historian; archaeologist

Academic background
- Education: Alleyne’s High School; University of Birmingham (BA); St John's College, Cambridge (PhD)
- Thesis: Burial and society at Athens, 1100–500 BC (1985)

Academic work
- Institutions: University of Chicago; Stanford University
- Notable works: Why the West Rules—For Now (2010)

Ian Matthew Morris (born 27 January 1960) is a British historian and archaeologist who is the Willard Professor of Classics at Stanford University.

== Early life and education ==
Morris was born on 27 January 1960 in Stoke-on-Trent, Staffordshire, England. He attended Alleyne's High School, a comprehensive school in Stone, Staffordshire. He studied at the University of Birmingham, graduating with a Bachelor of Arts (BA) degree in 1981. He undertook a Doctor of Philosophy (PhD) degree at St John's College, Cambridge, graduating in 1985. His doctoral thesis was titled "Burial and society at Athens, 1100-500 BC".

== Career ==
From 1987 to 1995, Morris taught at the University of Chicago. Since 1995, he has been at Stanford, where he has served as Associate Dean of Humanities and Sciences, Chair of the Classics Department, and Director of the Social Science History Institute. He was one of the founders of the Stanford Archaeology Center and served two terms as its director. He has published extensively on the history and the archaeology of the ancient Mediterranean and on world history. He has also won a Dean's Award for Excellence in Teaching in 2009.

Between 2000 and 2007, he directed Stanford's excavation at Monte Polizzo, Sicily, Italy.

He has been awarded research fellowships from the John Simon Guggenheim Memorial Foundation, Hoover Institution, National Endowment for the Humanities, Center for Hellenic Studies in Washington, D.C., and Institute for Research in the Humanities, University of Wisconsin-Madison. He is also a Corresponding Fellow of the British Academy and has been awarded honorary degrees by De Pauw University and Birmingham University. In 2012 his work was the subject of a lengthy profile in the Chronicle of Higher Education. He delivered the Tanner Lectures on Human Values at Princeton University in 2012.

Morris plans to develop his views on the first-millennium BC transformations (the shift from religion-based power to bureaucratic and military one, and the rise of Axial thought) in his new book.

== Why the West Rules—For Now ==
His 2010 book, Why the West Rules—For Now, compares East and West across the last 15,000 years, arguing that physical geography, rather than culture, religion, politics, genetics, or great men, explains Western domination of the globe. The Economist has called it "an important book—one that challenges, stimulates and entertains. Anyone who does not believe there are lessons to be learned from history should start here." The book won several literary awards, including the 2011 PEN Center USA Literary Award for Creative Nonfiction, and was named as one of the books of the year by Newsweek, Foreign Affairs, Foreign Policy, The New York Times, and a number of other newspapers. It has been translated into 13 languages.

== The Measure of Civilization ==
The Measure of Civilization is a companion volume to Why the West Rules—For Now. It provides details of the evidence and the statistical methods used by Morris to construct the social development index that he used in Why the West Rules to compare long-term Eastern and Western history. The International Studies Association and Social Science History Association devoted panels to discussing the book at their 2013 annual meetings. The book is being translated into Chinese.

== War! What is it Good For? ==
War! What is it Good For?: Conflict and the Progress of Civilization from Primates to Robots was published by Farrar, Straus & Giroux in the US and Profile Books in Britain in April 2014. Morris argues that there is enough evidence to trace the history of violence across many thousands of years and that a startling fact emerges. For all of its horrors, over the last 10,000 years, war has made the world safer and richer, as it is virtually the only way that people have found to create large, internally pacified societies that then drive down the rate of violent death. The lesson of the last 10,000 years of military history, he argues, is that the way to end war is by learning to manage it, not by trying to wish it out of existence. Morris also devotes a chapter to the 1974–1978 Gombe Chimpanzee War in Tanzania. The German translation of the book, Krieg: Wozu er gut ist, was published by Campus Verlag in October 2013. A Dutch translation was published in 2014 by Spectrum (Houten/Antwerp): Verwoesting en vooruitgang. Its Spanish translation was released in 2017, edited by Ático de Libros, under the title Guerra, ¿para qué sirve?.

== Awards and honors ==
- 2014 California Book Awards Nonfiction Finalist for War! What is it Good For?

== Works ==
- Burial and Ancient Society, Cambridge, 1987 ISBN 978-0-521-38738-5
- Death-Ritual and Social Structure in Classical Antiquity, Cambridge 1992 ISBN 978-0-521-37611-2
- Editor, Classical Greece: Ancient Histories and Modern Archaeologies, Cambridge, 1994 ISBN 978-0-521-45678-4
- Co-editor, with Barry B. Powell, A New Companion to Homer, E. J. Brill, 1997 ISBN 978-90-04-09989-0
- Co-editor, with Kurt Raaflaub, Democracy 2500? Questions and Challenges, Kendall-Hunt, 1997 ISBN 978-0-7872-4466-8
- Archaeology as Cultural History, Blackwell, 2000 ISBN 978-0-631-19602-0
- The Greeks: History, Culture, and Society, with Barry B. Powell; Prentice-Hall, 1st ed. 2005, 2nd ed. 2009 ISBN 978-0-13-921156-0
- Co-editor, with Joe Manning, The Ancient Economy: Evidence and Models, Stanford, 2005 ISBN 978-0-8047-5755-3
- Co-editor, with Walter Scheidel and Richard Saller, The Cambridge Economic History of the Greco-Roman World, Cambridge, 2007 ISBN 978-0-521-78053-7
- Co-editor, with Walter Scheidel, of The Dynamics of Ancient Empires, Oxford, 2009 ISBN 978-0-19-537158-1
- Why the West Rules—For Now: The Patterns of History, and What They Reveal About the Future, Farrar, Straus and Giroux, 2010; Profile Books, 2010 ISBN 978-0-374-29002-3
- The Measure of Civilisation: How Social Development Decides the Fate of Nations, Princeton University Press, 2013; Profile Books, 2013 ISBN 978-0-691-15568-5
- War! What is it Good For? Conflict and the Progress of Civilization from Primates to Robots, Farrar, Straus and Giroux, 2014; Profile Books, 2014 ISBN 978-0-374-28600-2
- Foragers, Farmers, and Fossil Fuels: How Human Values Evolve (The Tanner Lectures, edited and with an introduction by Stephen Macedo and commentaries by Richard Seaford, Jonathan D. Spence, Christine M. Korsgaard, and Margaret Atwood), Princeton University Press, 2015; ISBN 9780691160399
- Geography Is Destiny: Britain and the World: A 10,000-Year History, Farrar, Straus and Giroux, 2022; Profile Books, 2022 ISBN 9780374157272
