= Martin J. Eppler =

Swiss academic

Martin J. Eppler is a Swiss communication and management scholar, Professor of Media and Communication Management at the University of St. Gallen, and director of its Institute for Media and Communication Management, known for his contributions in the field of knowledge management, specifically information overload and Information Quality Management, Collaboration, and Knowledge Visualization.

== Biography ==
Eppler received his Master in Management from the University of St. Gallen and had also studied at the Boston University and the ESCP Europe. He received his PhD in Management from the University of Geneva with the thesis, entitled "Informative Action: An Analysis of Information Overload in Management." Back at the University of St. Gallen he received his habilitation for Management, with emphasis on Information and Communication Management. He has won 12 MBA teaching awards, six best paper awards, and he is the winner of the 2018 getabstract International Book Award and the 2021 European Innovation Excellence Award (for his Teaching of Research Methodology).

Eppler started his academic career as lecturer and project manager at the University of Geneva, while also working as consultant for the Geneva Knowledge Group. He then moved back to the University of St. Gallen, where he was appointed Senior Lecturer and Vice Director of the Institute for Media and Communication Management. In 2003 he was appointed Professor of Information and Communication Management at the University of Lugano, and since 2009 he is Professor of Media and Communication management at the University of St. Gallen, head of the ISP MBA program, and director of its Institute for Media and Communication Management.

Eppler has been a visiting professor at Georgiatech (Atlanta, USA), Simon Fraser University (Vancouver, Canada), the Central University of Finance and Economics (CUFE) Beijing, at the Aalto University in 2010, and at the Universidad del Pacifico Graduate School in 2011 as well as Cambridge University. He was a member of the editorial board of the reviews "OrganisationsEntwicklung," and formerly the "Journal of Universal Knowledge Management, and of "Studies in Communication Sciences," and "Information & Management."

== Selected publications ==
Eppler published 24 books and more than 300 articles in the fields of management, organization studies, communication, and visualization.

Select Books:

- Eppler, Martin (2024) Visipedia
- Eppler, Martin, Bresciani, Sabrina (2024) Visual Communication Design
- Eppler, Martin, Muntwiler, C., Buder, F., Unfried, M. (2023) Debias by Design
- Eppler, Martin, Bünzli, Fabienne (2022) How to talk about Data. Build your Data Fluency (Financial Times Publishing)
- Kernbach, S., Eppler, Martin (2022) Life Design Action Book
- Kernbach, S., Eppler, Martin (2020). Life Design
- Eppler, Martin J., Kernbach, Sebastian (2018) Meet up! (Cambridge University Press) Winner of the getabstract International Book Award
- Eppler, Martin J., Pfister, Roland, Hoffmann, Friederike (2014/2017). Creability. Second Edition.
- Eppler, Martin J., Kernbach, S., Pfister, Roland (2016). Dynagrams
- Eppler, Martin J., Mengis, Jeanne (2008) Management Atlas
- Reinmann, G. & Eppler, M. (2011). Wissenswege. Methoden für das persönliche Wissensmanagement.
- Eppler, M. J., Pfister, R. (2012/2017). Sketching at work. Second Edition. [translated into Chinese and Portuguese]
- Eppler, M.J. (2009) Managing Information Quality, Second Edition.

Articles, a selection:

- Muntwiler, Christian Eppler, Martin J. "Improving Decision Making through Visual Knowledge Calibration." Management Decision 8(61), 2374-2390, 2023.
- Lengler, Ralph, and Martin J. Eppler. "Towards a periodic table of visualization methods for management." IASTED Proceedings of the Conference on Graphics and Visualization in Engineering (GVE 2007), Clearwater, Florida, USA. 2007.
- Martin J. Eppler. "Making Knowledge Visible Through Intranet Knowledge Maps: Concepts, Elements, Cases," System Sciences, 2001. Proceedings of the 34th Annual Hawaii International Conference on. IEEE, 2001.
- Schindler, Martin, and Martin J. Eppler. "Harvesting project knowledge: a review of project learning methods and success factors." International Journal of Project Management 21.3 (2003): 219–228.
- Eppler, Martin J., and Jeanne Mengis. "The concept of information overload: A review of literature from organization science, accounting, marketing, MIS, and related disciplines." The information society 20.5 (2004): 325–344.
- Eppler, Martin J., Patrick Seifried, and Axel Röpnack. "Improving Knowledge Intensive Processes through an Enterprise Knowledge Medium (1999)." Kommunikationsmanagement im Wandel. Gabler, 2008. 371–389.
