= Eugene O'Kelly =

Eugene O'Kelly was a former chairman and CEO of KPMG, one of the largest U. S. accounting and consulting firms and one of the Big Four auditors.

Eugene was elected chairman and CEO of KPMG (U.S.) in 2002 for a term of six years. In May 2005, at age 53, Eugene was diagnosed with a terminal brain tumor. He resigned from KPMG and spent the rest of his time with friends and family. Eugene died on September 10, 2005, of terminal brain cancer.

Posthumously, Eugene published his experiences about accepting death and his last days as a memoir, Chasing Daylight. His wife Corinne O'Kelly contributed the last chapter of the book. The biography won, among other awards, the International Business Book Award from the Financial Times.

Eugene was survived by his wife Corinne O'Kelly and daughters Marianne and Gina.
