= Silicon Investor =

Stock market website

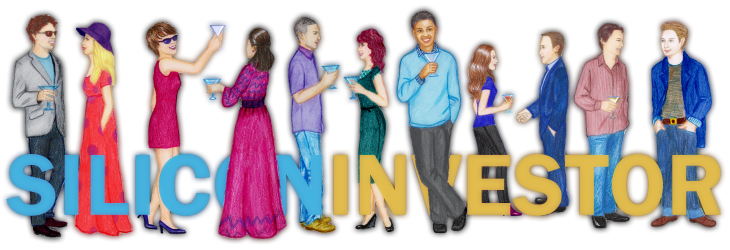
- Website type: Internet forum
- Available in: English language
- Founded: August 8, 1995; 31 years ago
- Headquarters: {{{location_country}}}
- Area served: Worldwide
- Website: www.siliconinvestor.com
- Advertising: Banner ads
- Current status: Active

Silicon Investor is the first website that evaluated the stocks of high-tech companies. It is an Internet forum and social networking service concentrating on stock market discussion, with particular focus on tech stocks. Silicon Investor is currently owned and operated by Knight Sac Media Holdings.

Billing itself the "first internet community", the site hosts 30 million message posts made by 90,000 registered users. In late 1996, SI accounted for 5% of the AltaVista search engine index.

== History ==
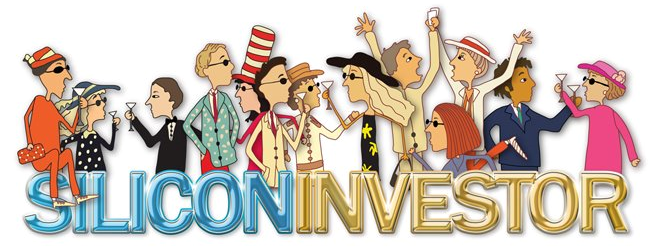
The original Silicon Investor logo (1995-2012)

Silicon Investor was launched on August 8, 1995, just a day before Netscape went public. It was founded in Cupertino, California by two brothers, Jeff and Brad Dryer. SI was the first Internet community to grow purely out of the web browser. In November 1995, the Dryer brothers relocated Silicon Investor to their home town of Kansas City. The website was financed by membership fees charged and contributions from the founders.

On June 24, 1998, Go2Net, a Seattle-based Internet investment firm, acquired of Silicon Investor for $35 million in Go2Net stock. At that time, the website was averaging 100 million pageviews per month. The original staff continued to work on the site. Go2Net planned on integrating Silicon Investor with Go2Net's Stocksite.

In the early 2000s, during the crash of the dot-com bubble, Silicon Investor started losing web-traffic to free messaging boards such as RagingBull.com and Yahoo's YHOO Finance. Bryan Burdick the managing director of Silicon Investor at the time, however, dismissed speculations that Silicon Investor was losing traffic because of competing websites that offered free membership.

Financial news and services website TheStreet.com speculated that Silicon Investor was losing traffic because renowned stock-pickers such as Tokyo Joe, Anthony Elgindy, and Barbara J. Simon who amassed followings on Silicon Investor, launched their own private websites similar to Silicon Investor.

In July 2000, InfoSpace (now Blucora) bought Go2Net for $4 billion in stock. The following year, it fired Silicon Investor's main moderator and investment guru Bob Zumbrunnen, whom The Wall Street Journal described as a cross between a “bouncer, diplomat, and traffic cop”. However, in May 2003, Zumbrunnen bought Silicon Investor from InfoSpace for $250,000 and relaunched it with a new design.

In 2011, Snurf LLC, a web investment company founded by Silicon Investor's original owner Brad Dryer (also known as Brad Fire), acquired the site.

In January 2013, Knight Sac Media Holdings Corporation acquired Silicon Investor and announced a slew of updates to Silicon Investor, from the display of banner advertisements to signed-in users, to redesign of the home page.

== Notable Members ==
=== Michael Burry ===
Michael Burry is a physician and American investment fund manager who founded more than 25 message boards on Silicon Investor, including subjects on Value Investing and Buffetology. Burry joined Silicon Investor in November 1996. Between 1996 and 2000, Burry wrote 3,304 posts, on average more than two per day. Initially, fellow Silicon Investor members were skeptical that a medical professional knew anything about the stock market. Burry went on to found Scion Capital LLC, an investment fund that managed at its peak roughly $1 billion. Burry correctly predicted the subprime mortgage crisis. He was prominently featured in The New York Times bestseller, The Big Short: Inside the Doomsday Machine by Michael Lewis.

=== Daniel S. Loeb ===
Daniel S. Loeb, also known as Mr.Pink, named after the character in Reservoir Dogs became a member of Silicon Investor in July 1996. Loeb is an American hedge fund manager and the CEO of Third Point LLC. In 2000, Loeb was named as a defendant in a ‘cybersmear’ suit for allegedly running a smear campaign on on-line messaging boards and forums, including Silicon Investor. Hitsgalore, an Internet marketing company, filed a $20 million lawsuit against five individuals, one of whom was Loeb. Hitsgalore claimed that several individuals tried to tarnish the company's reputation in order to drive down the price of Hitsgalore's stock.

In his Declaration in support of motion to dismiss the First Amendment complaint, Loeb was forced to out himself as Mr.Pink. In April 2000, Hitsgalore withdrew the lawsuit.

=== Anthony Elgindy ===
Anthony Elgindy, born Amr Ibrahim Elgindy in Egypt, was a member of Silicon Investor. Elgindy was known on the messaging board as Anthony@Pacific. He became a member of Silicon Investor in August 1998, and created his own message board, "Anthony@Equity Investigations, Dear Anthony”. In 1999, Silicon Investor banned Anthony Elgindy because his controversial postings violated the Terms and Conditions of Silicon Investor but later reinstated his membership after a user-vote. Elgindy subsequently opened a rival messaging site, WallStreet Strand.

In May 2002, Elgindy was arrested by the FBI in San Diego on racketeering and insider trading charges. Federal prosecutors alleged that Elgindy bribed an FBI agent to obtain classified information in order to manipulate stocks. Without offering any proof, a federal prosecutor also accused Elgindy of having advance knowledge of the 9/11 attacks, a charge Elgindy's lawyer called “ludicrous” and an example of “racial profiling”. Elgindy was never charged in connection with the attacks. In January 2005, Anthony Elgindy was convicted of racketeering, conspiracy, and securities fraud. Elgindy was sentenced to 11 years in prison and was ordered to pay $1.5 million in restitution.

=== Tokyo Joe ===
Yun Soo Oh Park is a South Korean immigrant who ran a chain of burrito restaurants in Manhattan. Park was known by his online moniker ‘Tokyo Joe’. In 1997, Tokyo Joe became a stock-picker when he began posting on messaging boards such as Silicon Investor and RagingBull.com. Tokyo Joe had written thousands of posts giving investment advice and advertising stock picks.

In 2000, U.S. Securities and Exchange Commission (SEC) filed civil fraud charges against Tokyo Joe claiming that Tokyo Joe used his online popularity and influence to increase the value of certain stocks. The SEC claimed that Tokyo Joe urged investors to purchase stocks without disclosing that he owned those stocks, which he planned to sell. In February 2000, Tokyo Joe paid a $750,000 fine to the SEC.

== Silicon Investor and the First Amendment Rights of Internet Users ==
In 1999, the stock price of 2TheMart.com, an online auction company, plunged after three class action lawsuits were filed, alleging that the company had misled investors and engaged in securities fraud. To defend itself against the lawsuits, the company claimed that it needed the identities of 23 Silicon Investor members who had posted messages critical of the company using pseudonyms on a Silicon Investor message board specifically devoted to 2TheMart.com. 2TheMart.com's lawyers issued a subpoena requesting that InfoSpace, then Silicon Investor's owner, reveal the users’ identities.

In 2001, a Silicon Investor member who used the pseudonym NoGuano enlisted the help of the ACLU and the Electronic Freedom Foundation to try and quash the subpoena. In April 2001, U.S. District Court Judge Thomas Zilly sided with the Silicon Investor member and ruled that Internet users had a First Amendment right to remain anonymous.

The Electronic Frontier Foundation, hailed the verdict as “a clear message that the court will not tolerate lawsuits designed to chill online speech.”

== Silicon Investor Sitemap ==
Silicon Investor is divided into 3 ‘top level’ discussion Internet forums: StockTalk, Politics, and Pastimes. Within StockTalk, there are six sub-forums: TechStocks, Biotech, Non-Tech, Gold/Mining/ Energy, Microcap, and Strategies. An additional forum, the “Site Forums” category available through the site-wide “SI” menu includes subjects boards related to site news, new feature discussion, a welcome thread and other housekeeping topics.

The header of Silicon Investor displays five menus: SI, Mail, SubjectMarks, PeopleMarks, and Tools. Through the SI menu, users can access the Member Store, Site Forums, review site policies and access the site FAQ. The mail menu provides user access to messaging from other members. SubjectMarks helps users keep track of their favorite subjects and save favorite posts. PeopleMarks allows users to follow the postings of other Silicon Investor members. The Global Tools menu gives users access to basic and advanced search features, profile maintenance, user settings and custom stock portfolios, a new feature.
