= List of awards and nominations received by Christian Bale =

Christian Bale awards and nominations
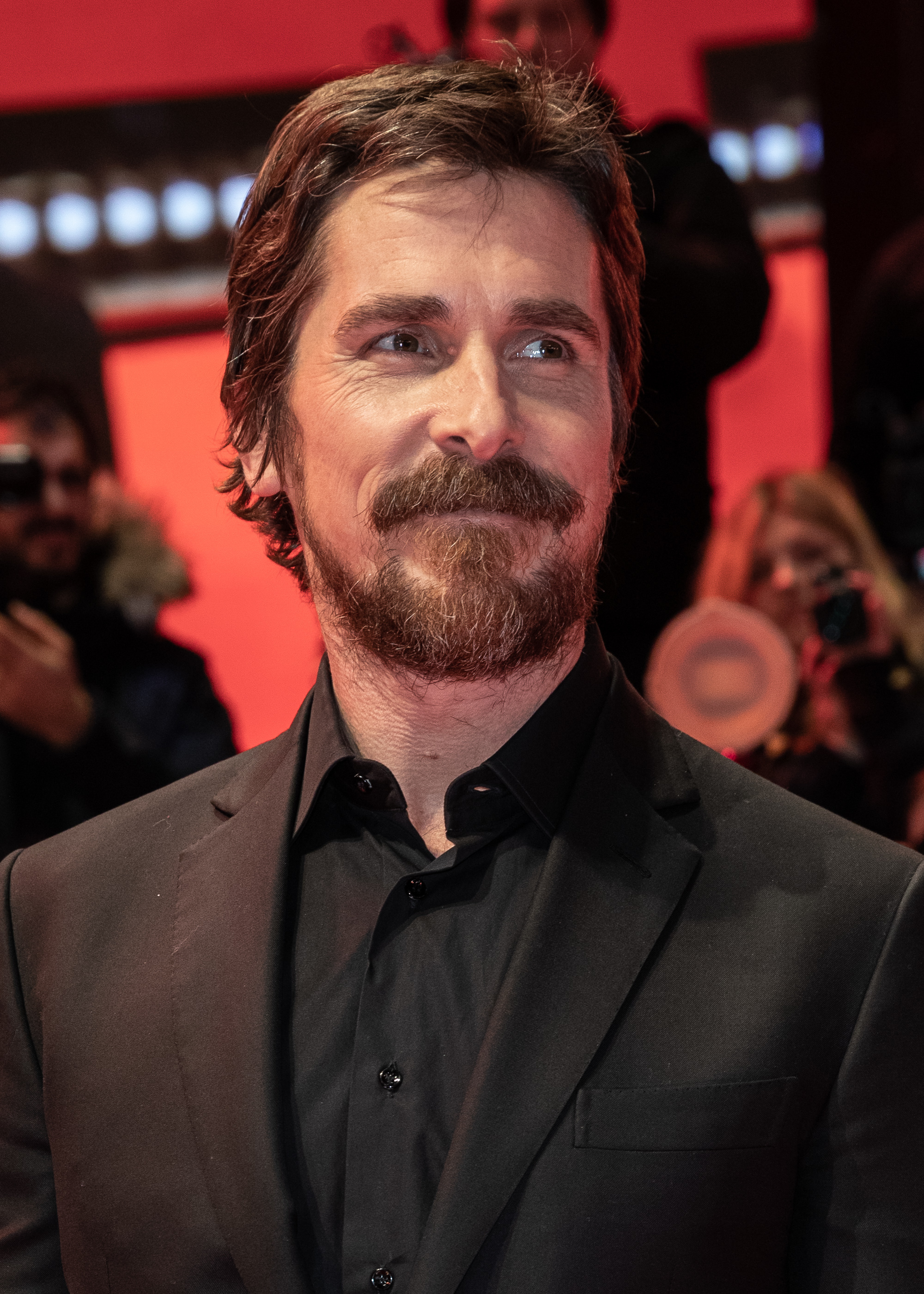
- Bale at the 2019 Berlinale
Awards and nominations
Award	Wins	Nominations
AACTA International Awards	0	3
Academy Awards	1	4
British Academy Film Awards	0	4
Critics' Choice Movie Awards	6	12
Dorian Awards	0	1
Empire Awards	1	4
European Film Awards	0	1
Golden Globe Awards	2	5
Independent Spirit Awards	1	1
Irish Film & Television Academy Awards	0	1
MTV Movie & TV Awards	1	8
National Board of Review	2	2
National Movie Awards	0	1
Palm Springs International Film Festival	2	2
People's Choice Awards	3	8
Russian National Movie Awards	1	4
Satellite Awards	3	5
Saturn Awards	1	5
Scream Awards	1	4
Screen Actors Guild Awards	2	7
Sitges Film Festival	1	1
Teen Choice Awards	0	1
Young Artist Awards	1	3

Totals (Note: Certain award groups do not simply award one winner. They acknowledge several different recipients, have runners-up, and have third place. Since this is a specific recognition and is different from losing an award, runner-up mentions are considered wins in this award tally. For simplification and to avoid errors, each award in this list has been presumed to have had a prior nomination.)
- Wins: 76
- Nominations: 196

Christian Bale is an English actor. Over his career he has received various awards including an Academy Award, two Actor Awards, six Critics' Choice Movie Awards, and two Golden Globe Awards as well as nominations for four British Academy Film Award.

Bale started his career making his film debut in Steven Spielberg's coming-of-age war epic Empire of the Sun (1987). He portrayed Patrick Bateman in the Mary Harron written-directed horror comedy American Psycho (2000) for which he was nominated for the Empire Award and London Film Critics Circle Award. He gained international stardom for his portrayal of Bruce Wayne / Batman in the Christopher Nolan directed superhero The Dark Knight trilogy (2005–2013). For Batman Begins (2005) he won the MTV Movie Award for Best Hero and the Saturn Award and was nominated for the Empire Award. For The Dark Knight (2008) he won the Empire Award and was nominated for the Critics' Choice Movie Award. For The Dark Knight Rises (2012) he was nominated for the Critics' Choice Movie Award, the MTV Movie Award, and the Saturn Award for Best Actor.

He played a disabled American Civil War veteran turned rancher in the James Mangold directed Western action drama 3:10 to Yuma (2007) for which he was nominated for the Actor Award. He played John Connor in the action film Terminator Salvation (2009) for which he was nominated for the Teen Choice Award. The following year he played boxer trainer Dicky Eklund in the David O. Russell directed sports drama The Fighter (2009) for which he won the Academy Award, the Actor Award, the Critics Choice Award and the Golden Globe Award as well as nomination for the BAFTA Award for Best Actor in a Supporting Role. He reunited with O. Russell playing con man Irving Rosenfeld in the historical crime comedy American Hustle (2013) for which he was nominated for the Academy Award, the BAFTA Award, Critics' Choice Movie Award and the Golden Globe Award.

Bale played financial investor Michael Burry in the Adam McKay directed financial comedy-drama The Big Short (2015) for which he won the Critics' Choice Movie Award for Best Actor in a Comedy and was nominated for the Academy Award, Actor Award, BAFTA Award and Golden Globe Award for Best Supporting Actor. He then reunited with McKay portraying Vice-President Dick Cheney in the political satire Vice (2018) for which he won the Golden Globe Award and the Actor Award and was nominated for the Academy Award, the BAFTA Award, and the Actor Award for Outstanding Actor in a Leading Role. He portrayed sports engineer Ken Miles reuniting with Mangold in the sports racing drama Ford v. Ferrari (2019) for which he was nominated for the Actor Award and the Golden Globe Award for Best Actor in a Motion Picture – Drama.

== Major associations ==
=== Academy Awards ===
Year	Category	Nominated work	Result	Ref.
2011	Best Supporting Actor	The Fighter	Won	
2014	Best Actor	American Hustle	Nominated	
2016	Best Supporting Actor	The Big Short	Nominated	
2019	Best Actor	Vice	Nominated	

=== Actor Awards ===
Year	Category	Nominated work	Result	Ref.
2008	Outstanding Cast in a Motion Picture	3:10 to Yuma	Nominated	
2011	Outstanding Cast in a Motion Picture	The Fighter	Nominated	
2011	Outstanding Actor in a Supporting Role	The Fighter	Won	
2014	Outstanding Cast in a Motion Picture	American Hustle	Won	
2016	Outstanding Cast in a Motion Picture	The Big Short	Nominated	
2016	Outstanding Actor in a Supporting Role	The Big Short	Nominated	
2019	Outstanding Actor in a Leading Role	Vice	Nominated	
2020	Outstanding Actor in a Leading Role	Ford v Ferrari	Nominated	

=== BAFTA Awards ===
Year	Category	Nominated work	Result	Ref.
British Academy Film Awards
2011	Best Actor in a Supporting Role	The Fighter	Nominated	
2014	Best Actor in a Leading Role	American Hustle	Nominated	
2016	Best Actor in a Supporting Role	The Big Short	Nominated	
2019	Best Actor in a Leading Role	Vice	Nominated	

=== Critics' Choice Awards ===
Year	Category	Nominated work	Result	Ref.
Critics' Choice Movie Awards
2009	Best Cast	The Dark Knight	Nominated	
2011	Best Acting Ensemble	The Fighter	Won	
2011	Best Supporting Actor	The Fighter	Won	
2013	Best Actor in an Action Movie	The Dark Knight Rises	Nominated	
2014	Best Acting Ensemble	American Hustle	Won	
2014	Best Actor	American Hustle	Nominated	
2014	Best Actor in a Comedy	American Hustle	Nominated	
2016	Best Acting Ensemble	The Big Short	Nominated	
2016	Best Actor in a Comedy	The Big Short	Won	
2019	Best Acting Ensemble	Vice	Nominated	
2019	Best Actor	Vice	Won	
2019	Best Actor in a Comedy	Vice	Won	

=== Golden Globe Awards ===
Year	Category	Nominated work	Result	Ref.
2011	Best Supporting Actor – Motion Picture	The Fighter	Won	
2014	Best Actor – Motion Picture Musical or Comedy	American Hustle	Nominated	
2016	Best Actor – Motion Picture Musical or Comedy	The Big Short	Nominated	
2019	Best Actor – Motion Picture Musical or Comedy	Vice	Won	
2020	Best Actor – Motion Picture Drama	Ford v Ferrari	Nominated	

== Other awards and nominations ==
Organizations	Year	Category	Work	Result	Ref.
AACTA International Awards	2014	Best Actor	American Hustle	Nominated	
AACTA International Awards	2016	Best Supporting Actor	The Big Short	Nominated	
AACTA International Awards	2019	Best Actor	Vice	Nominated	
AACTA International Awards	2020	Best Actor	Ford v Ferrari	Nominated	
Dorian Awards	2018	Film Performance of the Year – Actor	Vice	Nominated	
Empire Awards	2001	Best British Actor	American Psycho	Nominated	
Empire Awards	2006	Best Actor	Batman Begins	Nominated	
Empire Awards	2007	Best Actor	The Prestige	Nominated	
Empire Awards	2009	Best Actor	The Dark Knight	Won	
European Film Awards	2005	Audience Award for Best European Actor	The Machinist	Nominated	
Independent Spirit Awards	2008	Robert Altman Award	I'm Not There	Won	
Irish Film & Television Academy Awards	2005	Best International Actor	Batman Begins	Nominated	
MTV Movie & TV Awards	2006	Best Hero	Batman Begins	Won	
MTV Movie & TV Awards	2009	Best Male Performance	The Dark Knight	Nominated	
MTV Movie & TV Awards	2009	Best Fight (Note: Shared with Heath Ledger)	The Dark Knight	Nominated	
MTV Movie & TV Awards	2013	Best Shirtless Performance	The Dark Knight Rises	Nominated	
MTV Movie & TV Awards	2013	Best Hero	The Dark Knight Rises	Nominated	
MTV Movie & TV Awards	2013	Best Fight (Note: Shared with Tom Hardy)	The Dark Knight Rises	Nominated	
MTV Movie & TV Awards	2014	Best On-Screen Transformation	American Hustle	Nominated	
MTV Movie & TV Awards	2014	Best On-Screen Duo (Note: Shared with Amy Adams)	American Hustle	Nominated	
National Board of Review	1987	Outstanding Juvenile Performance	Empire of the Sun	Won	
National Board of Review	2010	Best Supporting Actor	The Fighter	Won	
National Movie Awards	2008	Best Performance – Male	The Dark Knight	Nominated	
Palm Springs International Film Festival	2014	Ensemble Cast Award	American Hustle	Won	
Palm Springs International Film Festival	2016	Ensemble Cast Award	The Big Short	Won	
People's Choice Awards	2009	Favorite Leading Man	The Dark Knight	Nominated	
People's Choice Awards	2009	Favorite Male Action Star	The Dark Knight	Nominated	
People's Choice Awards	2009	Favorite Superhero	The Dark Knight	Won	
People's Choice Awards	2009	Favorite On-Screen Match-Up	The Dark Knight	Won	
People's Choice Awards	2009	Favorite Cast	The Dark Knight	Won	
People's Choice Awards	2010	Favorite Action Star	Terminator Salvation	Nominated	
People's Choice Awards	2013	Favorite Action Movie Star	The Dark Knight Rises	Nominated	
People's Choice Awards	2013	Favorite Movie Superhero	The Dark Knight Rises	Nominated	
Russian National Movie Awards	2006	Best Actor	Batman Begins	Nominated	
Russian National Movie Awards	2008	Best Foreign Actor	The Dark Knight	Won	
Russian National Movie Awards	2013	Best Foreign Actor of the Year	American Hustle	Nominated	
Russian National Movie Awards	2014	Best Foreign Actor of the Decade	—	Nominated	
Satellite Awards	2007	Best Actor – Motion Picture	Rescue Dawn	Nominated	
Satellite Awards	2010	Best Supporting Actor – Motion Picture	The Fighter	Won	
Satellite Awards	2013	Best Actor – Motion Picture	American Hustle	Nominated	
Satellite Awards	2015	Best Supporting Actor – Motion Picture	The Big Short	Won	
Satellite Awards	2020	Best Actor – Motion Picture Drama	Ford v Ferrari	Won	
Saturn Awards	2005	Best Actor	The Machinist	Nominated	
Saturn Awards	2006	Best Actor	Batman Begins	Won	
Saturn Awards	2009	Best Actor	The Dark Knight	Nominated	
Saturn Awards	2011	Best Supporting Actor	The Fighter	Nominated	
Saturn Awards	2013	Best Actor	The Dark Knight Rises	Nominated	
Scream Awards	2006	Best Superhero	Batman Begins	Nominated	
Scream Awards	2006	Most Heroic Performance	Batman Begins	Nominated	
Scream Awards	2008	Best Fantasy Actor	The Dark Knight	Nominated	
Scream Awards	2008	Best Superhero	The Dark Knight	Won	
Sitges Film Festival	2004	Best Actor	The Machinist	Won	
Teen Choice Awards	2013	Choice Movie Actor – Action	The Dark Knight Rises	Nominated	
Young Hollywood Awards	1989	Best Young Actor in a Motion Picture – Drama	Empire of the Sun	Won	
Young Hollywood Awards	1993	Outstanding Youth Ensemble Cast in a Motion Picture	Newsies	Nominated	
Young Hollywood Awards	1994	Outstanding Youth Ensemble in a Motion Picture	Swing Kids	Nominated	

== Critics associations ==
Year	Association	Category	Nominated work	Result	Ref.
2000	Online Film Critics Society	Best Actor	American Psycho	Nominated	
2007	San Diego Film Critics Society	Body of Work	3:10 to Yuma, Rescue Dawn, I'm Not There	Won	
2007	Columbus Film Critics Association	Best Ensemble	3:10 to Yuma	Nominated	
2008	Columbus Film Critics Association	Best Ensemble	The Dark Knight	Won	
2010	Alliance of Women Film Journalists	Best Actor in a Supporting Role	The Fighter	Won	
2010	Austin Film Critics Association	Best Supporting Actor	The Fighter	Won	
2010	Boston Society of Film Critics	Best Supporting Actor	The Fighter	Won	
2010	Boston Society of Film Critics	Best Ensemble Cast	The Fighter	Won	
2010	Columbus Film Critics Association	Best Supporting Actor	The Fighter	Nominated	
2010	Columbus Film Critics Association	Best Ensemble	The Fighter	Won	
2010	Dallas–Fort Worth Film Critics Association	Best Supporting Actor	The Fighter	Won	
2010	Denver Film Critics Society	Best Supporting Actor	The Fighter	Won	
2010	Detroit Film Critics Society	Best Supporting Actor	The Fighter	Won	
2010	Florida Film Critics Circle	Best Supporting Actor	The Fighter	Won	
2010	Houston Film Critics Society	Best Supporting Actor	The Fighter	Won	
2010	Indiana Film Journalists Association	Best Supporting Actor	The Fighter	Won	
2010	Iowa Film Critics	Best Supporting Actor	The Fighter	Won	
2010	Kansas City Film Critics Circle	Best Supporting Actor	The Fighter	Won	
2010	Las Vegas Film Critics Society	Best Supporting Actor	The Fighter	Won	
2010	London Film Critics' Circle	British Actor of the Year	The Fighter	Won	
2010	National Society of Film Critics	Best Supporting Actor	The Fighter	Nominated	
2010	New York Film Critics Online	Best Supporting Actor	The Fighter	Won	
2010	North Texas Film Critics Association	Best Supporting Actor	The Fighter	Won	
2010	Online Film & Television Association	Best Supporting Actor	The Fighter	Won	
2010	Online Film Critics Society	Best Supporting Actor	The Fighter	Won	
2010	Phoenix Film Critics Society	Best Supporting Actor	The Fighter	Won	
2010	San Diego Film Critics Society	Best Supporting Actor	The Fighter	Nominated	
2010	San Diego Film Critics Society	Best Ensemble Performance	The Fighter	Nominated	
2010	Southeastern Film Critics Association	Best Supporting Actor	The Fighter	Nominated	
2010	Toronto Film Critics Association	Best Supporting Actor	The Fighter	Nominated	
2010	Utah Film Critics Association	Best Supporting Performance by an Actor	The Fighter	Won	
2010	Vancouver Film Critics Circle	Best Supporting Actor	The Fighter	Won	
2010	Washington D.C. Area Film Critics Association	Best Supporting Actor	The Fighter	Won	
2010	Washington D.C. Area Film Critics Association	Best Cast	The Fighter	Nominated	
2013	Phoenix Film Critics Society	Best Ensemble Acting	American Hustle	Won	
2013	Columbus Film Critics Association	Best Ensemble	American Hustle	Won	
2013	Denver Film Critics Society	Best Actor	American Hustle	Nominated	
2013	Houston Film Critics Society	Best Actor	American Hustle	Nominated	
2013	St. Louis Gateway Film Critics Association	Best Actor	American Hustle	Nominated	
2018	Dallas–Fort Worth Film Critics Association	Best Actor	Vice	Won	
2018	Detroit Film Critics Society	Best Ensemble	Vice	Won	
2018	Houston Film Critics Society	Best Actor	Vice	Won	
2018	Alliance of Women Film Journalists	Best Actor	Vice	Nominated	
2018	Austin Film Critics Association	Best Actor	Vice	Nominated	
2018	Chicago Film Critics Association	Best Actor	Vice	Nominated	
2018	Chicago Independent Film Critics Circle	Best Actor	Vice	Nominated	
2018	Denver Film Critics Society	Best Actor	Vice	Nominated	
2018	Detroit Film Critics Society	Best Actor	Vice	Nominated	
2018	Dublin Film Critics Circle	Best Actor	Vice	Nominated	
2018	Florida Film Critics Circle	Best Actor	Vice	Nominated	
2018	Georgia Film Critics Association	Best Actor	Vice	Nominated	
2018	Houston Film Critics Society	Best Actor	Vice	Won	
2018	Kansas City Film Critics Circle	Best Actor	Vice	Won (tie)	
2018	Latino Entertainment Journalists Association	Best Performance by an Actor in a Leading Role	Vice	Nominated	
2018	London Film Critics' Circle	Actor of the Year	Vice	Nominated	
2018	London Film Critics' Circle	British/Irish Actor of the Year	Vice	Nominated (Note: Also for his work in Mowgli: Legend of the Jungle.)	
2018	Los Angeles Online Film Critics Society	Best Actor	Vice	Nominated	
2018	Music City Film Critics Association	Best Actor	Vice	Won	
2018	Nevada Film Critics Society	Best Actor	Vice	Won	
2018	North Carolina Film Critics Association	Best Actor	Vice	Nominated	
2018	North Texas Film Critics Association	Best Actor	Vice	Nominated	
2018	Oklahoma Film Critics Circle	Best Supporting Actor	Vice	Won	
2018	Online Film & Television Association	Best Actor	Vice	Nominated	
2018	Online Film Critics Society	Best Actor	Vice	Nominated	
2018	Philadelphia Film Critics Circle	Best Actor	Vice	Won	
2018	Phoenix Critics Circle	Best Actor	Vice	Nominated	
2018	San Diego Film Critics Society	Best Actor	Vice	Nominated	
2018	San Francisco Film Critics Circle	Best Actor	Vice	Nominated	
2018	Seattle Film Critics Society	Best Ensemble Cast	Vice	Nominated	
2018	Southeastern Film Critics Association	Best Actor	Vice	Nominated	
2018	Southeastern Film Critics Association	Best Ensemble	Vice	Nominated	
2018	St. Louis Gateway Film Critics Association	Best Actor	Vice	Nominated	
2018	Utah Film Critics Association	Best Actor	Vice	Nominated	
2018	Vancouver Film Critics Circle	Best Actor	Vice	Nominated	
2018	Washington D.C. Area Film Critics Association Award	Best Acting Ensemble	Vice	Nominated	
2018	Washington D.C. Area Film Critics Association Award	Best Actor	Vice	Nominated	
2025	Online Film & Television Association	Film Hall of Fame	—	Won	

== See also ==
- Christian Bale filmography
