= Scion Asset Management =

Hedge fund based in California

Scion Asset Management, LLC
- Formerly: Scion Capital
- Type: Private
- Industry: Investment management
- Founded: 2000; 26 years ago
- Founder: Michael Burry
- Headquarters: 20400 Stevens Creek Blvd, Cupertino, CA 95014, United States
- AUM: US$155 million (2024)
- Number of employees: 6 (2024)
- Website: scionasset.com

Scion Asset Management, LLC is an American hedge fund headquartered in California, founded by Michael Burry. It is best known for profiting from the subprime mortgage crisis, as well as paving the way for the GameStop short squeeze.

== Scion Capital ==
In November 2000, Michael Burry started the hedge fund Scion Capital, funded by an inheritance and loans from his family. Joel Greenblatt's Gotham Capital was also an investor in it. Burry named the fund after Terry Brooks' The Scions of Shannara (1990), one of his favorite novels. He quickly earned extraordinary profits for his investors. According to author Michael Lewis, from 2001 to 2003, Scion beat the S&P 500 each year. Scion was able to achieve these returns partly by shorting overvalued tech stocks at the peak of the internet bubble. By the end of 2004, Scion was managing $600 million but turned away further money as the fund was designed to be bad for business but good for investing.

By the middle of 2005, Scion was up 242%. On May 19, 2005, Burry did his first subprime mortgage bond deal by buying $60 million of credit default swaps (CDS) from Deutsche Bank. In October, Burry wrote to investors that Scion had at least a billion dollars in CDS on subprime mortgage bonds.

Investors who had trusted Burry's stock picking skills did not have confidence in his bet to short the housing market. During payments toward the CDS, Scion suffered an investor revolt, where some investors demanded to withdraw their capital. Eventually Burry's analysis proved correct when by middle of 2007, the subprime mortgage market started collapsing. Scion made $725 million for investors with Burry personally making $100 million. Scion ultimately recorded returns of 489.34% (net of fees and expenses) between its November 1, 2000, inception and June 2008. Over the same period the S&P 500 returned just over 2%.

In 2008, Burry shut down Scion due to public backlash in response to his schemes and numerous audits from the Internal Revenue Service. Burry was also motivated to close Scion to focus on other investment ventures.

== Scion Asset Management ==
In 2013, Burry reopened the Scion hedge fund under the name Scion Asset Management. Its aim was to generate personal investments, which include water, farmland, and gold.

In August 2019, Scion disclosed major stakes in GameStop and Tailored Brands as well as two South Korean small cap companies where it would take an activist approach. Burry urged GameStop and Tailored Brands to buy back shares. It is believed that Scion's acquisition of GameStop shares as well as its subsequent company share repurchase set the stage for the GameStop short squeeze. In late 2020, Scion sold its entire stake in GameStop. Scion missed out on the GameStop short squeeze which occurred only a few months later. Its 5.3% stake would have been worth over $1.5 billion at its height. However GameStop still traded over five times its original cost when Scion sold it leading to a profit of around $100 million.

In May 2021, Scion disclosed it acquired put options on Tesla shares. In November, Scion exited its position against Tesla. It also exited its positions for call options on Alphabet Inc and put options on ARK Innovation.

From May 2020 to May 2023, traders following the investments disclosed by Scion would have made annualized returns of 56%. In the same period, S&P 500 had annualized returns of about 12%.

In August 2023, it was reported Scion anticipated a stock market crash and acquired $1.6 billion worth of put options to bet against the ETFs that tracked the S&P 500 and the Nasdaq-100. In November, Scion exited its position against the two ETFs. As they declined in the third quarter of the year by around 3%, it's believed Scion profited. Scion also was noted to have held a large put option against the iShares Semiconductor ETF. By the end of 2023, Scion exited all its bearish positions and bought stocks related to healthcare, technology and financial services. It also increased its positions in Alibaba Group and JD.com making them its biggest holdings.

In November 2024 it was reported Scion increased its holdings significantly in Alibaba Group, JD.com and Baidu. They were all hedged with put options to limit losses. While many investors were cautious about investing in China, Burry was one of the few China bulls along with Appaloosa Management’s David Tepper.

In February 2025, China's stock market rallied $1.3 trillion after the emergence of DeepSeek. Although Scion had reduced some of its Chinese holdings before the end of 2024, they were still its top holdings.

In May 2025, Scion disclosed it liquidated almost its entire listed equity portfolio in the first quarter, while acquiring put options on Nvidia and China-related stocks. This was done before US President Donald Trump launched a trade war.

In November 2025, Scion disclosed it had bought more than $1 billion in put options to bet against Nvidia and Palantir Technologies. Scion also disclosed call options on Pfizer and Halliburton. During the same month it was reported that Burry had announced the closure of Scion in a letter to investors, writing "My estimation of value in securities is not now, and has not been for some time, in sync with the markets." Scion was deregistered according to the United States Securities and Exchange Commission database. Burry later clarified saying "Scion Asset Management is not closing as it is my vehicle for running other investment ventures, too. It is no longer an RIA, and no longer runs a fund for outside investors."

== In popular culture ==
=== Film ===
- 2015: Adam McKay, The Big Short.
- 2023: Craig Gillespie, Dumb Money.

=== Literature ===
- 2010: Michael Lewis, The Big Short
- 2009: Gregory Zuckerman, The Greatest Trade Ever
