= Christian Bale filmography =

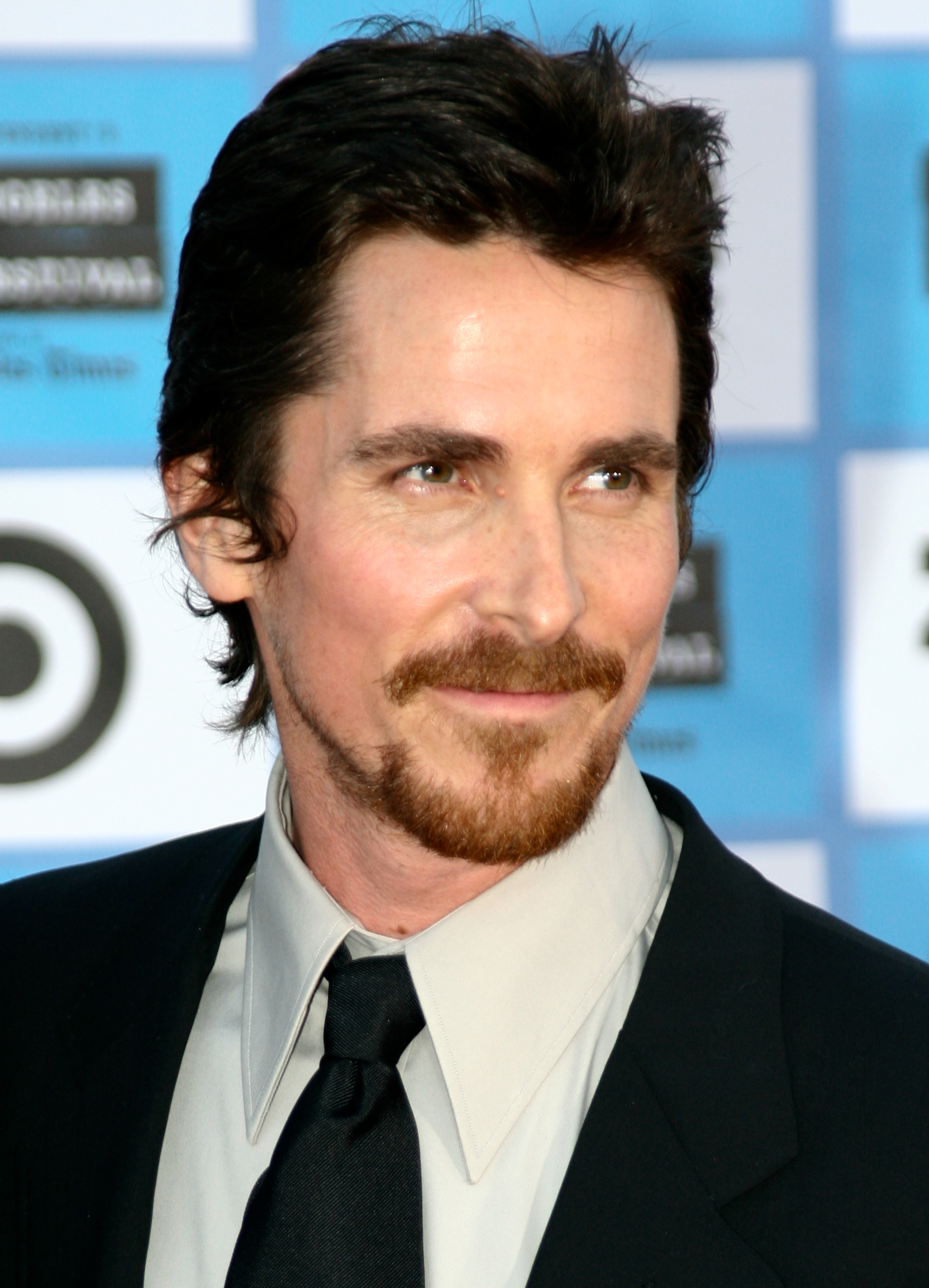
- Film: 50
- Television: 6

Christian Bale is an English actor who has starred in various films. Bale's role in Empire of the Sun, as a young boy interned in China by the Japanese, received praise from most film critics. Two years later, Bale had a minor role in Henry V, a drama film based on William Shakespeare's play The Life of Henry the Fifth. It has been considered one of the best Shakespeare film adaptations ever made. In 1992, Bale starred as Jack Kelly in the Walt Disney musical drama Newsies, which was a critical and commercial failure; however, it gained a cult following. He received a role in the 1994 drama Little Women, which garnered positive reviews. Bale lent his voice to the Disney animated film Pocahontas in 1995; it received a mixed reception, but attained box office success. He starred as British journalist Arthur Stuart in the Todd Haynes-directed drama Velvet Goldmine (1998). Although critics were divided on the film, Bale's role was "eagerly anticipated". Bale portrayed Demetrius in the critically praised 1999 film A Midsummer Night's Dream, an adaptation of Shakespeare's play of the same name, directed by Michael Hoffman. The same year, he portrayed Jesus of Nazareth in the television movie Mary, Mother of Jesus.

In 2000, Bale starred in the psychological thriller American Psycho in which he played the serial killer Patrick Bateman. His portrayal received positive reviews from critics and is often considered his breakthrough role. The same year, he starred alongside Samuel L. Jackson in the critically praised action crime film Shaft. He co-starred with Nicolas Cage and Penélope Cruz in the romance drama Captain Corelli's Mandolin (2001). The film was panned by film critics and had a poor commercial performance. For the portrayal of Trevor Reznik in the psychological thriller The Machinist (2004), he lost 63 pounds (28.5 kg). Although the film was commended by critics, it was a commercial failure. Bale starred as Batman in Batman Begins (2005), a reboot of the Batman film series directed by Christopher Nolan. His portrayal of Batman was critically acclaimed and the movie became a box office success. He subsequently lent his voice in the Batman Begins based video game with the same title. In 2006, he portrayed German-American aviator Dieter Dengler in the war drama Rescue Dawn. Despite positive reviews, the film was a box office flop. The same year, he starred in The Prestige (2006) alongside Hugh Jackman and Scarlett Johansson. It received positive reviews and was a commercial success at the box office. Bale co-starred with Russell Crowe in the Western 3:10 to Yuma (2007), which was positively received by movie critics and performed moderately at the box office.

Bale reprised his role as Batman in the second part of Nolan's Batman film series, the sequel of 2005's Batman Begins entitled The Dark Knight (2008). After its release, the film received highly positive reviews and is widely considered one of the best films of the 2000s. It grossed more than $1 billion worldwide. A year later, he starred in the fourth installment of the Terminator film series, Terminator Salvation (2009) as John Connor. The film was poorly received by most movie critics; however, it was a commercial success. The same year, Bale starred together with Johnny Depp in the critical and commercial success Public Enemies as FBI agent Melvin Purvis. He acted alongside Mark Wahlberg in the biographical sports drama The Fighter (2010) as Dicky Eklund. The film was critically acclaimed and a commercial success. The Fighter earned Bale the Academy Award for Best Supporting Actor at the 83rd Academy Awards. In 2012, Bale starred in the third, and final, installment of Nolan's Batman film trilogy entitled The Dark Knight Rises as Batman. As with its predecessors, the film received acclaim from movie critics. The Dark Knight Rises has earned more than $1 billion worldwide, thus becoming the third highest-grossing film of 2012. For his role as Michael Burry in the Adam McKay-directed biographical dramedy The Big Short, he was nominated for an Academy Award and BAFTA Award for Best Supporting Actor. He received another Oscar nomination for Best Actor for portraying Dick Cheney in McKay's Vice. He played Gorr the God Butcher, the villain in the Marvel Studios film Thor: Love and Thunder (2022).

== Film ==
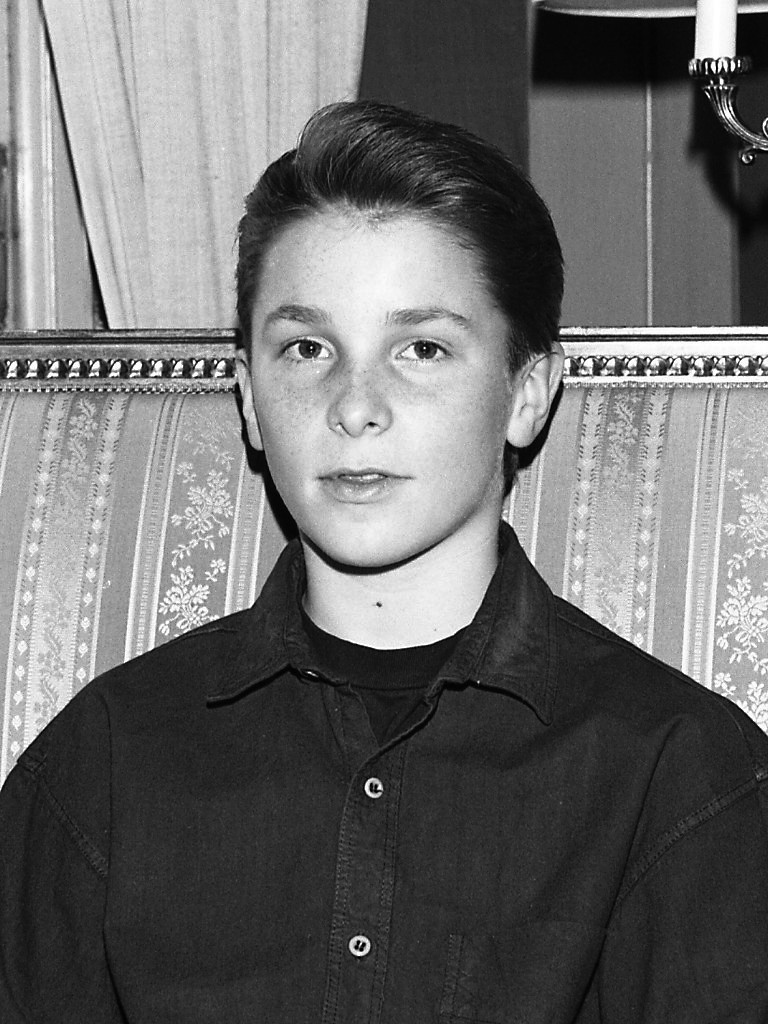
Bale promoting Empire of the Sun in 1988

Year	Title	Role	Notes	Ref.
1987	Mio in the Land of Faraway	Yum Yum		
1987	Empire of the Sun	Jim Graham		
1989	Henry V	Falstaff's Boy		
1992	Newsies	Jack Kelly		
1993	Swing Kids	Thomas Berger		
1994	Prince of Jutland	Prince Amled		
1994	Little Women	Theodore "Laurie" Laurence		
1995	Pocahontas	Thomas	Voice	
1996	The Portrait of a Lady	Edward Rosier		
1996	The Secret Agent	Stevie		
1997	Metroland	Chris Lloyd		
1998	Velvet Goldmine	Arthur Stuart		
1998	All the Little Animals	Bobby Platt		
1999	A Midsummer Night's Dream	Demetrius		
2000	American Psycho	Patrick Bateman		
2000	Shaft	Walter Wade Jr.		
2001	Captain Corelli's Mandolin	Mandras		
2002	Laurel Canyon	Sam		
2002	Reign of Fire	Quinn Abercromby		
2002	Equilibrium	John Preston		
2004	The Machinist	Trevor Reznik		
2004	Howl's Moving Castle	Howl Pendragon	Voice; English dub	
2005	Batman Begins	Bruce Wayne / Batman		
2005	The New World	John Rolfe		
2005	Harsh Times	Jim Davis	Also executive producer	
2006	Rescue Dawn	Dieter Dengler		
2006	The Prestige	Alfred Borden / Fallon		
2007	3:10 to Yuma	Dan Evans		
2007	I'm Not There	Jack Rollins / Pastor John		
2008	The Dark Knight	Bruce Wayne / Batman		
2009	Terminator Salvation	John Connor		
2009	Public Enemies	Melvin Purvis		
2010	The Fighter	Dicky Eklund		
2011	The Flowers of War	John Miller		
2012	The Dark Knight Rises	Bruce Wayne / Batman		
2013	Out of the Furnace	Russell Baze		
2013	American Hustle	Irving Rosenfeld		
2014	Exodus: Gods and Kings	Moses		
2015	Knight of Cups	Rick		
2015	The Big Short	Michael Burry		
2016	The Promise	Christopher "Chris" Myers		
2017	Hostiles	Captain Joseph J. Blocker		
2018	Mowgli: Legend of the Jungle	Bagheera	Voice and motion capture	
2018	Vice	Dick Cheney		
2019	Ford v Ferrari	Ken Miles		
2022	Thor: Love and Thunder	Gorr the God Butcher		
2022	Amsterdam	Burt Berendsen	Also producer	
2022	The Pale Blue Eye	Augustus Landor	Also producer	
2023	The Boy and the Heron	Shoichi Maki	Voice; English dub	
2026	The Bride!	Frankenstein's monster/Frank		
2026	Madden	Al Davis		

Key
†	Denotes films that have not yet been released

== Television ==
Year	Title	Role	Notes	Ref(s)
1986	Anastasia: The Mystery of Anna	Alexei	Television film	
1987	Heart of the Country	Ben Harris	4 episodes	
1990	Treasure Island	Jim Hawkins	Television film	
1991	A Murder of Quality	Tim Perkins	Television film	
1999	Mary, Mother of Jesus	Jesus of Nazareth	Television film	

== Video game ==
Year	Title	Role	Ref(s)
2005	Batman Begins	Bruce Wayne / Batman	

== See also ==
- List of awards and nominations received by Christian Bale
