= Christian Bale =

English actor (born 1974)

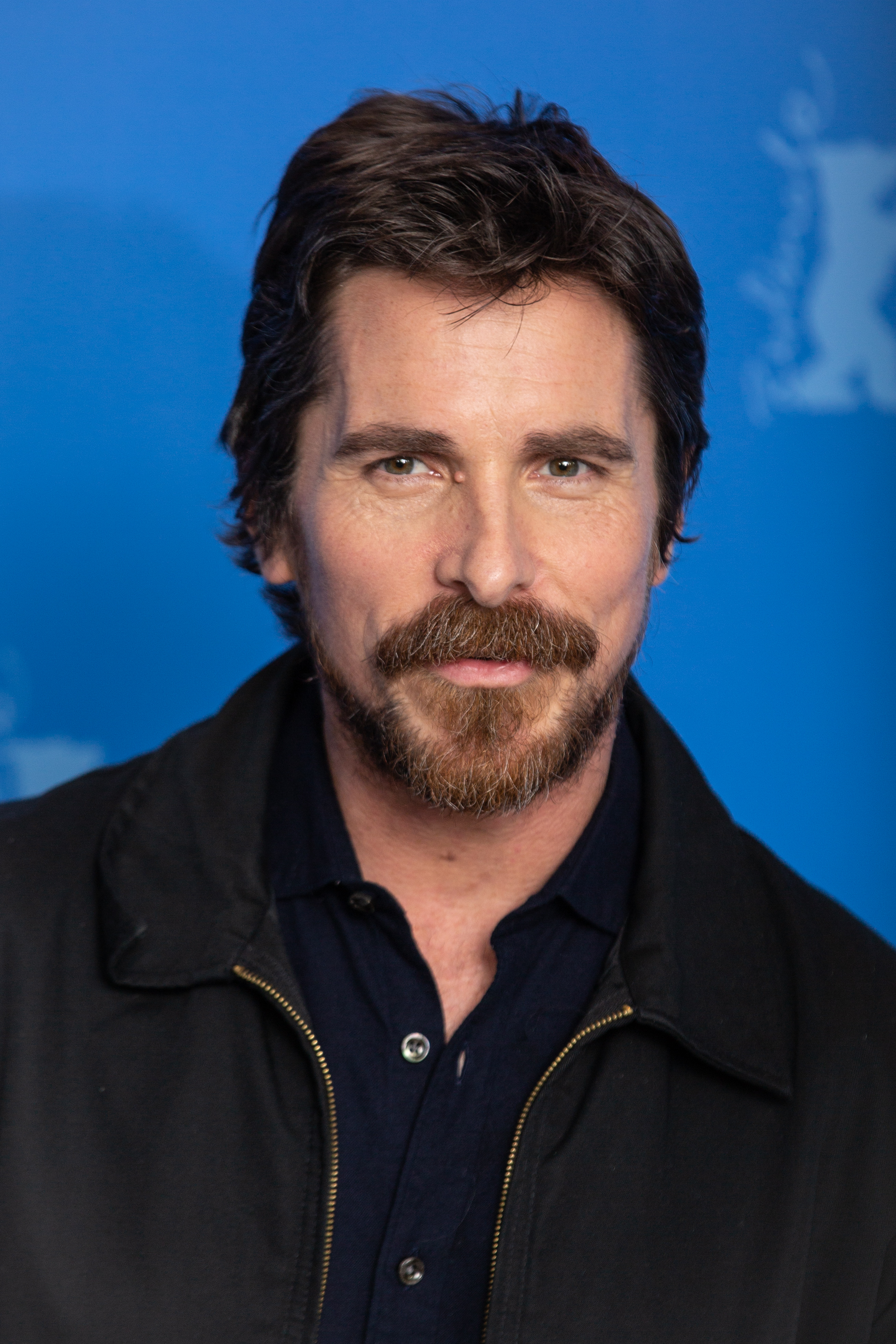
- Bale in 2019
- Born: Christian Charles Philip Bale; 30 January 1974 (age 52); Haverfordwest, Pembrokeshire, Wales
- Citizenship: United Kingdom; United States
- Occupation: Actor
- Years active: 1986–present
- Works: Full list
- Spouse: Sibi Blažić (m. 2000)
- Children: 2
- Father: David Bale
- Relatives: Gloria Steinem (stepmother)
- Awards: Full list

Christian Charles Philip Bale (born 30 January 1974) is an English actor. (Note: Bale has said: "I was born in Wales but I'm not Welsh—I'm English".) Known for his versatility and physical transformations for his roles, he has been a leading man in films of several genres. His accolades include an Academy Award and two Golden Globe Awards, in addition to nominations for four BAFTAs. He was one of the highest-paid actors in 2014, and The Independent later named him one of the greatest actors of the 21st century.

Bale had his breakthrough role at age 13 in Steven Spielberg's 1987 war film Empire of the Sun. After more than a decade of leading and supporting roles in films, he gained wider recognition for his portrayals of the serial killer Patrick Bateman in the black comedy American Psycho (2000) and the title role in the thriller The Machinist (2004). He played the superhero Batman in Christopher Nolan's The Dark Knight trilogy (2005–2012), one of the highest-grossing film franchises.

Outside his work as Batman, Bale had starring roles in a range of films. For his portrayal of the boxer Dicky Eklund in David O. Russell's biographical film The Fighter (2010), he won the Academy Award for Best Supporting Actor. Further Academy Award nominations came for his work in Russell's black comedy American Hustle (2013) and Adam McKay's biographical satires The Big Short (2015) and Vice (2018). For portraying the American vice president Dick Cheney in the latter, he won a second Golden Globe. Bale has since played Ken Miles in the sports drama Ford v Ferrari (2019) and Gorr the God Butcher in the superhero film Thor: Love and Thunder (2022).

== Early life and education ==
Christian Charles Philip Bale was born on 30 January 1974 in Haverfordwest, Pembrokeshire, Wales, to English parents—Jenny James, a circus performer, and David Bale, an entrepreneur and activist. Bale has remarked, "I was born in Wales but I'm not Welsh—I'm English". He has two elder sisters, Sharon and Louise, and a half-sister from his father's first marriage, Erin. One of his grandfathers was a comedian while the other was a stand-in for John Wayne. Bale and his family left Wales when he was two years old, and after living in Portugal and Oxfordshire, England, they settled in Bournemouth, England. As well as saying that the family had lived in 15 towns by the time he was 15, Bale described the frequent relocation as being driven by "necessity rather than choice" and acknowledged that it had a major influence on his career selection.

He attended Bournemouth School until the age of 16. Bale's parents divorced in 1991, and at age 17, he moved with his sister Louise and their father to Los Angeles, California, in the United States.

Bale trained in ballet as a child. His first acting role came at eight years old in a commercial for the fabric softener Lenor. He also appeared in a Pac-Man cereal commercial. After his sister was cast in a West End musical, Bale considered taking up acting professionally. He said later he did not find acting appealing but pursued it at the request of those around him because he had no reason not to do so. After participating in school plays, Bale performed opposite Rowan Atkinson in the play The Nerd in the West End in 1984. He did not undergo any formal acting training.

== Career ==
=== Early roles and breakthrough (1986–1999) ===
After deciding to become an actor at age ten, Bale secured a minor role in the 1986 television film Anastasia: The Mystery of Anna. Its star, Amy Irving, who was married to the director Steven Spielberg, subsequently recommended Bale for Spielberg's 1987 film Empire of the Sun. At age 13, Bale was chosen from over 4,000 actors to portray a British boy in a Second World War Japanese internment camp. For the film, he spoke with an upper-class cadence without the help of a dialogue coach. The role propelled Bale to fame, and his work earned him acclaim and the inaugural Best Performance by a Juvenile Actor Award from the National Board of Review of Motion Pictures. Earlier in the same year, he starred in the fantasy film Mio in the Land of Faraway, based on the novel Mio, My Son by Astrid Lindgren. The fame from Empire of the Sun led to Bale being bullied in school and finding the pressures of working as an actor unbearable. He grew distrustful of the acting profession because of media attention but said that he felt obligated at a young age to continue to act for financial reasons. Around this time, the actor and filmmaker Kenneth Branagh persuaded Bale to appear in his film Henry V in 1989, which drew him back into acting. The following year, Bale played Jim Hawkins opposite Charlton Heston as Long John Silver in Treasure Island, a television film adaptation of Robert Louis Stevenson's 1883 novel.

Bale starred in the 1992 Disney musical film Newsies, which was unsuccessful both at the box office and with critics. Rebecca Milzoff of Vulture revisited the film in 2012 and found the cracks in Bale's voice during his performance of the song "Santa Fe" charming and apt even though he was not a great singer. In 1993 he appeared in Swing Kids, a film about teenagers who secretly listen to forbidden jazz during the rise of Nazi Germany. In Gillian Armstrong's 1994 film Little Women, Bale played Theodore "Laurie" Laurence following a recommendation from Winona Ryder, who starred as Jo March. The film achieved critical and commercial success. Of Bale's performance, Ryder said he captured the complex nature of the role. He next voiced Thomas, a young compatriot of Captain John Smith, in the 1995 Disney animated film Pocahontas, which attracted a mixed critical reception. Bale played a small part in the 1996 film The Portrait of a Lady, based on the Henry James novel of the same name, and appeared in the 1998 musical film Velvet Goldmine, set in the 1970s during the glam rock era. In 1999 he was part of an ensemble cast, which included Kevin Kline and Michelle Pfeiffer, portraying Demetrius in A Midsummer Night's Dream, a film adaptation of the play by William Shakespeare.

=== Rise to prominence and commercial decline (2000–2004) ===
Bale played Patrick Bateman, an investment banker and serial killer, in American Psycho, a film adaptation of Bret Easton Ellis's novel of the same name, directed by Mary Harron. While Harron had chosen Bale for the part, the film's production and distribution company, Lionsgate, originally disagreed and hired Leonardo DiCaprio to play Bateman with Oliver Stone to direct. Bale and Harron were brought back after DiCaprio and Stone had left the project. Bale exercised and tanned himself for months to achieve Bateman's chiseled physique and had his teeth capped to assimilate to the character's narcissistic nature. American Psycho premiered at the 2000 Sundance Film Festival. Harron said the film critic Roger Ebert named it the most hated film at the event. Of Bale's work, Ebert wrote he "is heroic in the way he allows the character to leap joyfully into despicability; there is no instinct for self-preservation here, and that is one mark of a good actor." The film was released in April 2000, becoming a commercial and critical success and later developing a cult following; the role established Bale as a leading man.

In the four years that followed American Psycho, Bale's career experienced critical and commercial failure. He next played a villainous real estate heir in John Singleton's action film Shaft and appeared in John Madden's film adaptation of the Louis de Bernières novel Captain Corelli's Mandolin as Mandras, a Greek fisherman who vies with Nicolas Cage's title character for the affections of Pelagia, played by Penélope Cruz. Bale said he found it refreshing to play Mandras, who is emotionally humane, after working on American Psycho and Shaft. In 2002, he appeared in three films: Laurel Canyon, Reign of Fire and Equilibrium. Reviewing Laurel Canyon for Entertainment Weekly, Lisa Schwarzbaum called Bale's performance "fussy". After having reservations about joining the post-apocalyptic Reign of Fire, which involved computer-generated imagery, Bale professed his enjoyment of making films that could go awry and cited director Rob Bowman as a reason for his involvement. In Equilibrium, he plays a police officer in a futuristic society and performs gun kata, a fictional martial art that incorporates gunfighting. IGN's Jeff Otto characterised Reign of Fire as "poorly received" and Equilibrium as "highly underrated", while The Independent's Stephen Applebaum described the two films along with Shaft and Captain Corelli's Mandolin as "mediocre fare".

Bale starred as the insomnia-ridden, emotionally dysfunctional title character in the psychological thriller The Machinist. To prepare for the role, he initially only smoked cigarettes and drank whiskey. His diet later expanded to include black coffee, an apple and a can of tuna per day. Bale lost 63 pounds (29 kg), weighing 121 pounds (55 kg) to play the character, who was written in the script as "a walking skeleton". His weight loss prompted comparisons with Robert De Niro's weight gain in preparation to play Jake LaMotta in the 1980 film Raging Bull. Describing his transformation as mentally calming, Bale claimed he had stopped working for a while because he did not come upon scripts that piqued his interest and that the film's script drew him to lose weight for the part. The Machinist was released in October 2004; it performed poorly at the box office. Roger Moore of the Orlando Sentinel regarded it as one of the best films of the year, and Todd McCarthy of Variety wrote that Bale's "haunted, aggressive and finally wrenching performance" gave it a "strong anchor".

=== Batman and dramatic roles (2005–2008) ===
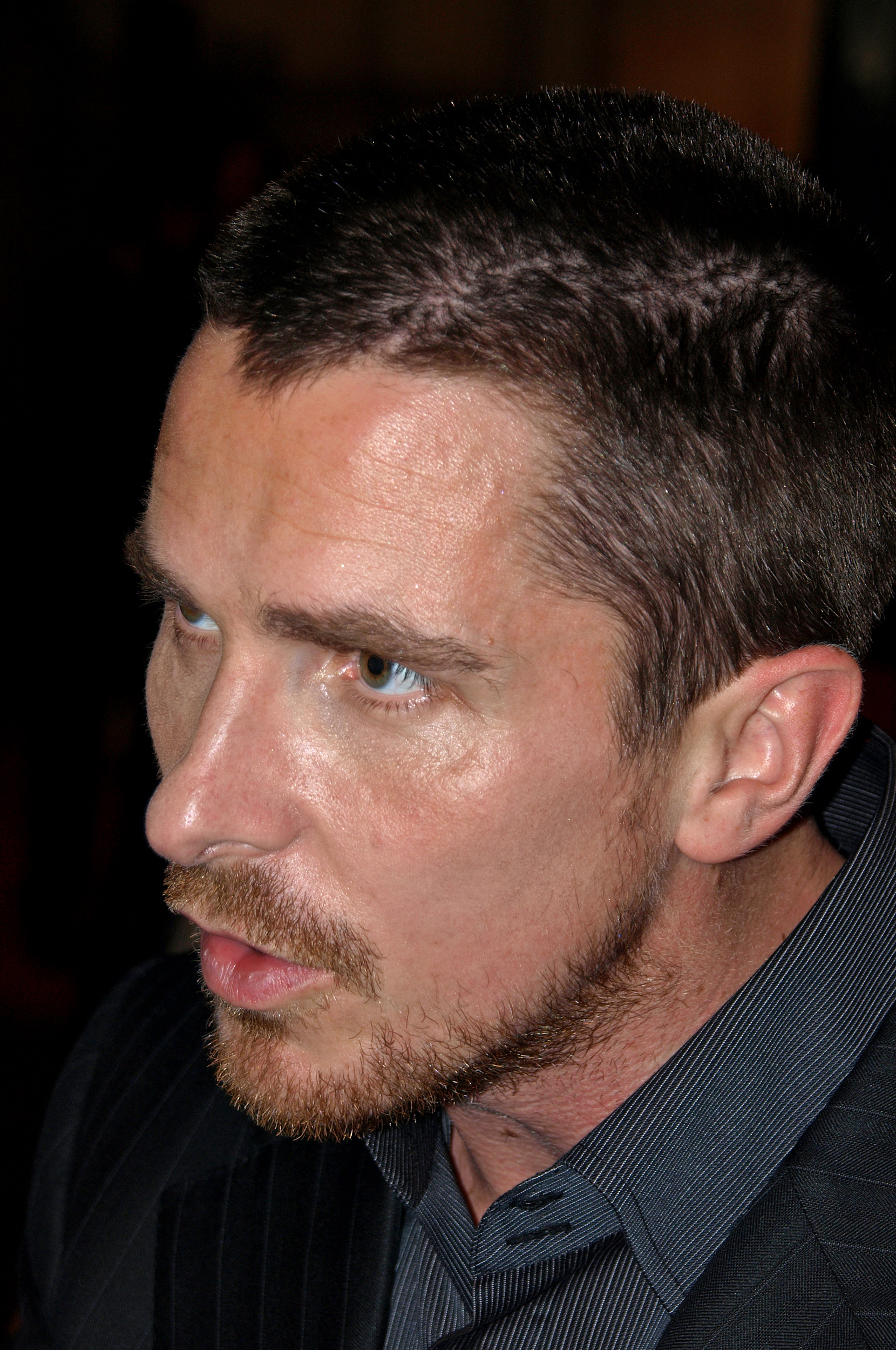
Bale at the Spanish premiere of The Dark Knight in 2008

Bale portrayed Bruce Wayne and his superhero alias, Batman, in Christopher Nolan's Batman Begins, a reboot of the Batman film series. Nolan cast Bale, who was still fairly unknown at the time, because Bale had "exactly the balance of darkness and light" Nolan sought. For the part, Bale regained the weight he lost for The Machinist and built muscle, weighing 220 pounds (100 kg). He trained in weapons, Wing Chun Kung Fu and the Keysi Fighting Method. Acknowledging the story's peculiar circumstances involving a character "who thinks he can run around in a batsuit in the middle of the night", Bale said he and Nolan had deliberately approached it with "as realistic a motivation as possible", referencing Wayne's parents' murder. Bale voiced Wayne and Batman differently. He employed gravelly tone qualities for Batman, which Nolan believed reinforced the character's visual appearance. Batman Begins was released in the US in June 2005. Tim Grierson and Will Leitch of Vulture complimented Bale's "sensitive, intelligent portrayal of a spoiled, wayward Bruce who finally grows up (and fights crime)." The performance earned Bale the MTV Movie Award for Best Hero.

In the same year, Bale voiced the titular Howl, a wizard, in the English-language dub of Hayao Miyazaki's Howl's Moving Castle, a Japanese animated film adaptation of Diana Wynne Jones's novel of the same name. He committed himself to voice the role after watching Miyazaki's animated film Spirited Away. Later that year, he starred as a US war veteran who deals with post-traumatic stress disorder in the David Ayer-helmed crime drama Harsh Times, which premiered at the Toronto International Film Festival. He portrayed the colonist John Rolfe in The New World, a historical drama film inspired by the stories of Pocahontas, directed by Terrence Malick. The film was released in December 2005. The following year saw the premiere of Rescue Dawn, by the German filmmaker Werner Herzog, in which Bale portrayed the American fighter pilot Dieter Dengler, who fights for his life after being shot down while on a mission during the Vietnam War. After the two worked together, Herzog stated that he had considered Bale to be among his generation's greatest talents long before he played Batman. The Austin Chronicle's Marjorie Baumgarten viewed Bale's work as a continuance of his "masterful command of yet another American personality type."

For the 2006 film The Prestige, Bale reunited with Batman Begins director Nolan, who said that Bale was cast after offering himself for the part. It is based on the 1995 novel by Christopher Priest about a rivalry between two Victorian era magicians, whom Bale and Hugh Jackman play in the film. While it attracted acclaim from critics, the film performed more modestly during its run in theatres, earning $110 million against a $40 million budget. In his review for The New York Times, A. O. Scott highlighted Bale's "fierce inwardness" and called his performance "something to savor". Bale next starred in the 2007 drama films I'm Not There, portraying two incarnations of singer-songwriter Bob Dylan, and in 3:10 to Yuma, playing a justice-seeking cattleman. He characterised his Dylan incarnations as "two men on a real quest for truth" and attributed his interest in 3:10 to Yuma to his affinity for films where he gets to "just be dirty and crawling in the mud". Bale reprised the role of Batman in Nolan's Batman Begins sequel The Dark Knight, with Heath Ledger joining the cast as the Joker. The film received widespread acclaim and became the fourth to gross more than $1 billion worldwide upon its July 2008 release. He did many of his own stunts, including one that involved standing on the roof of the Sears Tower in Chicago. The Dark Knight has been regarded by critics as the best superhero film.

=== The Dark Knight trilogy completion and acclaim (2009–2012) ===
In February 2008, Warner Bros. announced that Bale would star as the rebellion leader John Connor in the post-apocalyptic action film Terminator Salvation, directed by McG, who cited Bale as "the most credible actor of his generation". In February 2009 an audio recording of a tirade on the film's set in July 2008 involving Bale was released. It captured him directing profanities towards and threatening to attack the film's cinematographer Shane Hurlbut, who walked onto the set during the filming of a scene acted by Bale and Bryce Dallas Howard, and culminated in Bale threatening to quit the film if Hurlbut was not fired. Several colleagues in the film industry defended Bale, attributing the incident to his dedication to acting. Bale publicly apologised in February 2009, calling the outburst "inexcusable" and his behaviour "way out of order" and claiming he had made amends with Hurlbut. Terminator Salvation was released in May 2009 to tepid reviews. Claudia Puig of USA Today considered Bale's work to be "surprisingly one-dimensional", while The Age's Jake Wilson wrote he gave one of his least compelling performances. Bale later admitted he knew during production that the film would not revitalise the Terminator franchise as he had wished. He asserted he would not work with McG again.

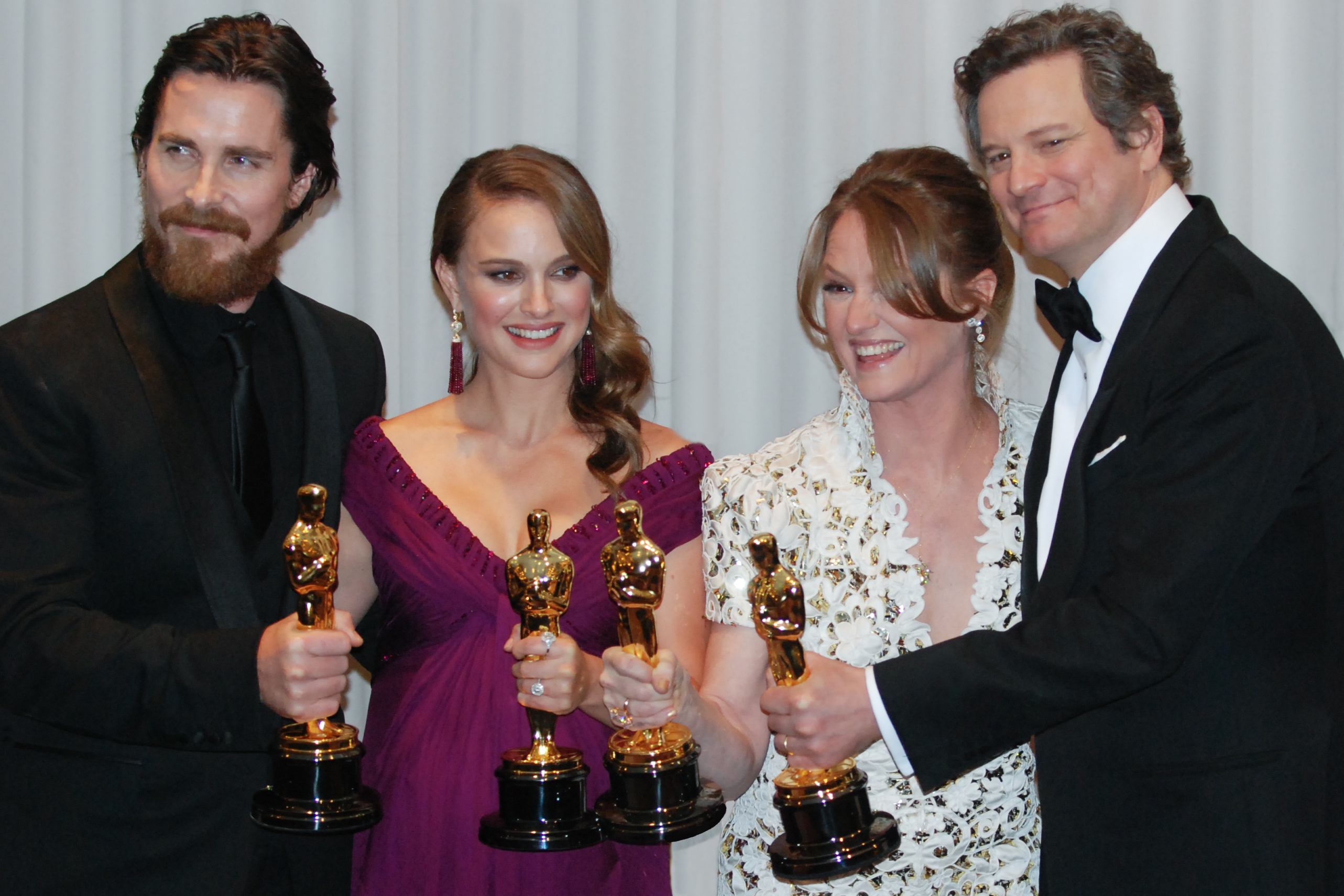
Bale (far left) at the 83rd Academy Awards in 2011, where he won the Academy Award for Best Supporting Actor

Bale portrayed the Federal Bureau of Investigation agent Melvin Purvis opposite Johnny Depp as the gangster John Dillinger in Michael Mann's crime drama Public Enemies. Released in July 2009, it earned critical praise and had a commercially successful theatrical run. Dan Zak of The Washington Post was unsatisfied with the casting of Bale and Depp, believing their characters' rivalry lacked electricity, while The New Republic's Christopher Orr found Bale's "characteristically closed off" performance "nonetheless effective". The following year, Bale starred in the role of Dicky Eklund, a professional boxer whose career has ended due to his drug addiction, in David O. Russell's drama film The Fighter. It chronicles the relationship between Eklund and his brother and boxing trainee, Micky Ward, played by Mark Wahlberg. To balance Eklund's tragic condition, Bale incorporated humour in his characterisation. The portrayal, for which he lost 30 pounds (14 kg), was acclaimed, the San Francisco Chronicle's Mick LaSalle describing it as "shrewdly observed, physically precise and psychologically acute". Bale won the Academy Award for Best Supporting Actor and the Golden Globe Award for Best Supporting Actor – Motion Picture for his performance. In 2011 he starred in Zhang Yimou's historical drama film The Flowers of War, which was the highest-grossing Chinese film of the year. Critics described it as "nationalistic", "anti-Japanese" and "too long, too melodramatic, too lightweight".

Bale played Batman again under Nolan's direction in the sequel The Dark Knight Rises, released in July 2012. He described Batman in the film as a remorseful recluse in poor mental and physical health, who has surrendered following the events of The Dark Knight. Following a mass shooting at a midnight showing of the film in Aurora, Colorado, US, Bale and his wife visited survivors, doctors and first responders at the Medical Center of Aurora as well as a memorial to victims. The Dark Knight Rises was the 11th film to gross more than $1 billion worldwide, surpassing The Dark Knight. Nolan's Batman film series, dubbed the Dark Knight trilogy, is one of the highest-grossing film franchises. It is also regarded as one of the best comic book film franchises. Bale's performance in the three films garnered universal acclaim, with The Guardian, The Indian Express, MovieWeb, NME and a poll conducted by the Radio Times ranking it as the best portrayal of Batman on film. Bale later revealed his dissatisfaction with his work throughout the trilogy, saying he "didn't quite nail" his part and that he "didn't quite manage" what he had hoped he would as Batman.

=== Continued critical success (2013–2019) ===
In 2013 Bale played a steel mill worker in Scott Cooper's thriller Out of the Furnace. Cooper rewrote the film's script with Bale in mind before the two even met and would not proceed with the project without the actor's involvement. Critics commended the film and deemed it an excellent beginning of the next phase in Bale's career after playing Batman, with Kristopher Tapley of Variety noting his work in the film was his best. That same year, he starred in American Hustle, which reunited him with David O. Russell after their work on The Fighter. To play the con artist Irving Rosenfeld, Bale studied footage of interviews with the real-world con artist Mel Weinberg, who served as inspiration for the character. He gained 43 pounds (20 kg), shaved part of his head and adopted a slouched posture, which reduced his height by 3 inches (7.6 cm) and caused him to suffer a herniated disc. Russell indicated that Robert De Niro, who appeared in an uncredited role, did not recognise Bale when they were first introduced. Writing for the New York Daily News, Joe Neumaier found Bale's performance to be "sad, funny and riveting". He was nominated for an Academy Award and a Golden Globe Award for his work.

Bale portrayed Moses in Ridley Scott's epic film Exodus: Gods and Kings. Released in December 2014, the film faced accusations of whitewashing for the casting of Caucasian actors in Middle Eastern roles. Scott justified casting decisions citing financing needs, Bale stating that Scott had been forthright in getting the film made. Its critical response varied between negative and mixed, and the St. Louis Post-Dispatch's Joe Williams called Bale's performance in the film the most apathetic of his career. Bale appeared in Terrence Malick's drama Knight of Cups, which The Atlantic critic David Sims dubbed a "noble failure". During its premiere at the 65th Berlin International Film Festival in February 2015, he said he filmed the project without having learned any dialogue and that Malick had only given him a character description. Later that year, he starred as Michael Burry, an antisocial hedge fund manager, in Adam McKay's The Big Short, a biographical comedy-drama film about the 2008 financial crisis. The Wall Street Journal's Joe Morgenstern found his portrayal "scarily hilarious—or in one-liners and quick takes, deftly edited". The role earned Bale Academy Award and Golden Globe Award nominations for Best Supporting Actor.

In the 2016 historical drama The Promise, set during the Armenian genocide, he played an American journalist who becomes involved in a love triangle with a woman, played by Charlotte Le Bon, and an Armenian medical student, played by Oscar Isaac. Critics disapproved of the film, which accrued a $102 million loss. Reviewing the film for The New York Times, Jeannette Catsoulis wrote that Bale appeared "muffled and indistinct". About the film, Bale says, "It's got to be a larger conversation because it has to be relevant today… often the violators get away with impunity. But it's such an important part of modern history, so tragic, so barbaric." In Cooper's 2017 film Hostiles, Bale starred as a US Army officer escorting a gravely ill Cheyenne war chief and his family back to their home in Montana. He calls the film "a western with brutal, modern-day resonance" and his character "a bigoted and hate-filled man". Bale learned the Cheyenne language while working on the film. Empire critic Dan Jolin considered his performance striking and one of the strongest of his career. In 2018, Bale voiced Bagheera in the adventure film Mowgli: Legend of the Jungle. Rolling Stone's David Fear wrote that his voice work and that of Andy Serkis, who directed the film, "bring the soul as well as sound and fury".

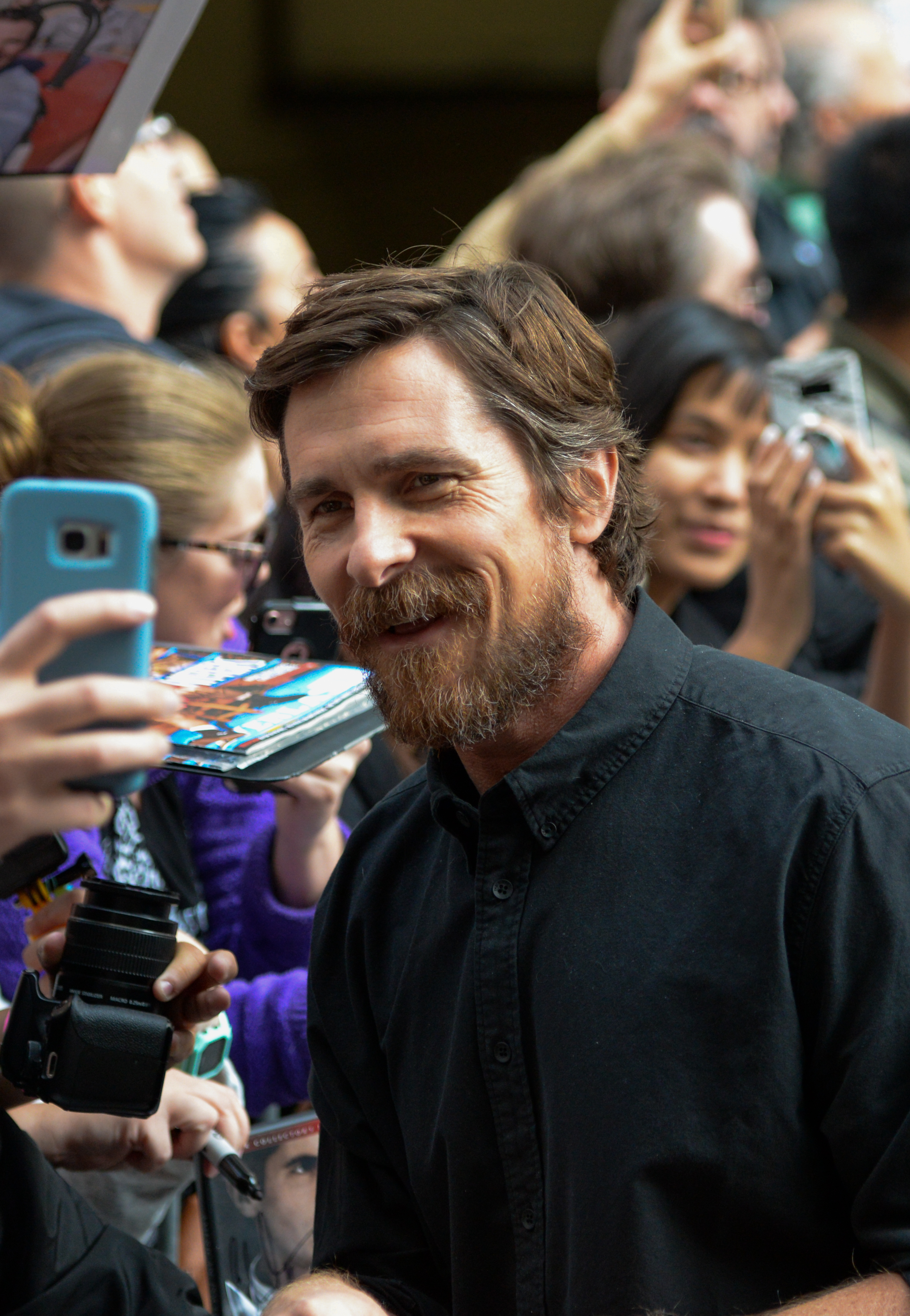
Bale at the 2019 Toronto International Film Festival

For the 2018 biographical comedy drama Vice, written and directed by Adam McKay, Bale underwent a major body transformation once again, as he gained over 40 pounds (18 kg) and shaved his head to portray US Vice President Dick Cheney. He described Cheney, who is reckoned the most influential and loathed vice president in US history, as "quiet and secretive". The film reunited Bale with Amy Adams, with whom he had co-starred in The Fighter and American Hustle. It received positive reviews, and The Guardian's Peter Bradshaw commended Bale's "terrifically and in fact rather scarily plausible" Cheney impersonation. Lauded by critics, the performance won Bale the Golden Globe Award for Best Actor – Motion Picture Musical or Comedy and garnered him an Academy Award nomination. During his acceptance speech at the 76th Golden Globe Awards, Bale thanked Satan for inspiring his Cheney portrayal, which elicited a response from Cheney's daughter and US Representative Liz Cheney, who stated that Bale ruined his opportunity to play "a real superhero".

Bale portrayed the sports car racing driver Ken Miles in the 2019 sports drama Ford v Ferrari, for which he lost 70 pounds (32 kg) after playing Cheney. Directed by James Mangold, the film follows Miles and the automotive designer Carroll Shelby, played by Matt Damon, in events surrounding the 1966 24 Hours of Le Mans race. The role earned Bale a fifth Golden Globe Award nomination. While promoting the film, he said he would no longer go through weight fluctuations for roles.

=== Limited work (2020–present) ===
Bale played Gorr the God Butcher, a villain, in the Marvel Cinematic Universe superhero film Thor: Love and Thunder, which was released in July 2022. He cited a character in the music video for the Aphex Twin song "Come to Daddy" as an inspiration for his characterization of Gorr. Bale's portrayal drew praise from critics, who deemed it "grounded and non-campy". He produced and appeared in David O. Russell's period film Amsterdam and Scott Cooper's thriller The Pale Blue Eye, reuniting with both directors for the third time. Amsterdam was released in October 2022, receiving dire reviews and failing at the box office. The Pale Blue Eye, adapted from the 2006 novel by Louis Bayard, was released in December 2022, receiving mixed reviews from critics. With his involvement in the 2023 Japanese animated film The Boy and the Heron, Bale voiced a character in an English-language dub of a film by Hayao Miyazaki for the second time.

Bale played Frankenstein's monster in Maggie Gyllenhaal's fantasy period film The Bride!, which was released on 6 March 2026. He also portrayed the football coach and the Las Vegas Raiders owner Al Davis in the John Madden biopic Madden, working with Russell for the fourth time.

== Artistry and public image ==
Bale is known for his exhaustive dedication to the weight fluctuations that his parts demand as well as "the intensity with which he completely inhabits his roles", with The Washington Post's Ann Hornaday rating him among the most physically gifted actors of his generation. Max O'Connell of RogerEbert.com deemed Bale's commitment to altering his physical appearance "an anchoring facet to a depiction of obsession" in his performances, while the Los Angeles Times's Hugh Hart likened the urgency that drives Bale's acting style to method acting, adding that it "convincingly animates even his most extreme physical transformations." Bale has said that he does not practise method acting and that he does not use a particular technique. He named Rowan Atkinson as his template as an actor and added that he was mesmerised by him when they worked together. He also studied the work of Gary Oldman, crediting him as the reason for his pursuit of acting.

Bale has been recognised for his versatility; Martha Ross of The Mercury News named him one of his generation's most versatile actors. Known to be very private about his personal life, Bale has said that his objective was to embody characters without showing any aspect of himself. He explained that "letting people know who you are" does not help create different characters, viewing anonymity as "what's giving you the ability to play those characters". During interviews to promote films in which he puts on an accent, Bale would continue speaking in the given accent. Bale has also been noted for portraying roles with an American accent, with The Atlantic's Joe Reid listing him among those who "work least in their native accents"; in real life, Bale speaks in an "emphatic, non-posh" English accent.

Bale is often described as a sex symbol. He was ranked at number eight on Forbes magazine's list of the highest-paid actors of 2014, earning $35 million. The Independent named Bale one of the greatest film actors of the 21st century in 2025.

== Personal life ==
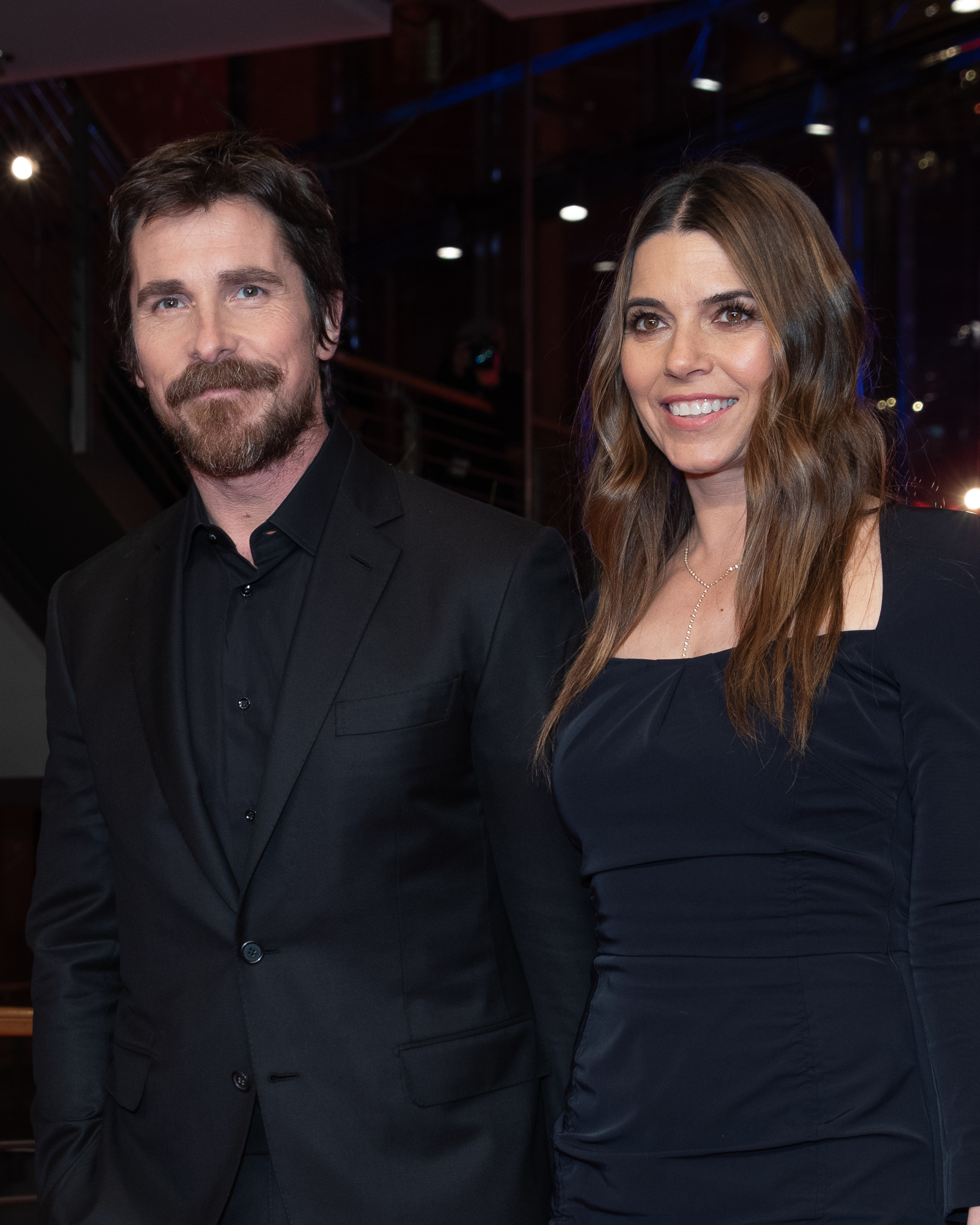
Bale and his wife, Sibi Blažić, at the 2019 Berlin Film Festival

Bale has lived in Los Angeles since the 1990s and holds both UK and US citizenships. He married Sandra "Sibi" Blažić, an American former model of Serbian descent, in Las Vegas on 29 January 2000. They have a daughter and a son. In 2000, Bale's father married feminist Gloria Steinem; he died in 2003 of brain lymphoma.

On 22 July 2008, Bale was arrested in London after his mother and his sister Sharon reported him to the police for an alleged assault at a hotel. He was released on bail. Bale denied the allegations and later called the incident "a deeply personal matter". On 14 August, the Crown Prosecution Service declared they would take no further action against him because of "insufficient evidence to afford a realistic prospect of conviction".

Bale became a vegetarian at the age of seven, but in 2009 he stated that he was "in and out of the vegetarianism now". He had stopped eating red meat after reading the children's book Charlotte's Web. An animal rights activist, he supports the organisations Greenpeace, the World Wide Fund for Nature, the Doris Day Animal League, the Dian Fossey Gorilla Fund International and Redwings Horse Sanctuary. While promoting The Flowers of War in December 2011, Bale, with a crew from the television network CNN, attempted to visit Chen Guangcheng, a confined blind barefoot lawyer, in a village in eastern China. He was forced to retreat after scuffling with guards at a checkpoint. Bale finally met Chen at a dinner held by the nonprofit Human Rights First the following year, during which he presented Chen with an award. Bale voiced Chen's story in Amnesty International's podcast, In Their Own Words.

Bale supports recognition of the Armenian genocide.

Along with Eric Esrailian and Tim McCormick, Bale co-founded California Together, an organization aiming to construct a $22 million village in Palmdale, California to help siblings in foster care remain together.

== Acting credits and accolades ==
According to the review aggregation website Rotten Tomatoes, which assigns films scores based on the number of positive critical reviews they receive, some of Bale's highest-scoring films are The Dark Knight (2008), Ford v Ferrari (2019), American Hustle (2013), Little Women (1994), The Fighter (2010), Rescue Dawn (2007), 3:10 to Yuma (2007), The Big Short (2015), Howl's Moving Castle (2005) and The Dark Knight Rises (2012); the first, third and last of which are also listed by the data website The Numbers as his highest-grossing films, alongside Terminator Salvation (2009), Batman Begins (2005), Pocahontas (1995), Thor: Love and Thunder (2022) and Exodus: Gods and Kings (2014).

Bale has garnered four Academy Award nominations, including two in the Best Actor category for his work in American Hustle and Vice (2018) as well as two in the Best Supporting Actor category for his work in The Fighter and The Big Short; he won one for The Fighter. He has earned two Golden Globe Awards, including Best Supporting Actor – Motion Picture for his role in The Fighter and Best Actor – Motion Picture Musical or Comedy for his role in Vice, and received two nominations for Best Actor – Motion Picture Musical or Comedy for his performances in American Hustle and The Big Short and a nomination for Best Actor – Motion Picture Drama for his performance in Ford v Ferrari. Bale has also been nominated for eight Actor Awards, winning in the Outstanding Performance by a Male Actor in a Supporting Role category for The Fighter and the Outstanding Performance by a Cast in a Motion Picture category as part of the American Hustle cast.
