= Anthony Elgindy =

Rogue trader (1967–2015)

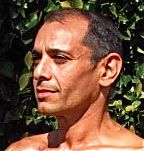
- Anthony Elgindy in 2010
- Born: Amr Ibrahim Elgindy; November 28, 1967
- Died: July 23, 2015 (aged 47)
- Citizenship: Egypt
- Occupations: stock broker, day trader
- Known for: Founder of Pacific Equity Investigations

Anthony Elgindy (November 28, 1967 – July 23, 2015), was an American stock broker and financial commentator who founded Pacific Equity Investigations. Elgindy gained a reputation for his "investigations" of companies. Towards the end of his life, Elgindy was convicted of insider trading and served seven years in federal prison.

Born in Egypt as Amr Ibrahim Elgindy, Elgindy was known professionally as "Anthony@Pacific", the "Internet's most theatrical short-seller".

== Early life and education ==
Elgindy was born in Egypt as Amr Ibrahim Elgindy and moved with his family to suburban Chicago as a young child. His father was a professor and his mother a pediatrician. He left high school without graduating and obtained an equivalency certificate in 1985, then studied biomedical engineering at the University of Southern California and biology at San Diego State University, completing less than two years of coursework. In 1986, at the age of 18, he was arrested in Los Angeles on a charge of assault with a deadly weapon; the charge was later dropped.

== Brokerage career ==
Before entering the securities industry, Elgindy sold cars at three Chevrolet dealerships over the course of a year. In 1988, he became a stock trader. He passed the Series 7 examination in April 1988 and registered that month with the penny stock brokerage Blinder Robinson, remaining there until December 1988. Over the following six years he was registered with J. W. Gant & Associates, Thomas James Associates, AMR Securities and, briefly in 1994, Bear Stearns. In 1994, he moved to Texas to operate his own brokerage.

Elgindy later told federal authorities that he and brokers at another firm had accepted bribes from stock promoters seeking to manipulate share prices. The CNBC series American Greed identified that firm as Armstrong McKinley and reported that federal investigators shut it down. According to court records, Elgindy was granted immunity in 1995 in exchange for information about the scheme, and his cooperation helped prosecutors obtain convictions against four people on tax evasion charges.

In July 1995 Elgindy became the owner and chief trader of Key West Securities, Inc., a NASD member firm, where he remained registered until July 1998.< By the late 1990s he had recast himself publicly as a short seller who exposed fraudulent companies, and was profiled in Business Week and Wired and featured on the Discovery Channel program Justice Files. He built a following on the online stock forum Silicon Investor and later sold stock tips through his own website for a subscription fee of $600 a month.

=== Insider trading ===
After 2000, Elgindy began working with FBI agent Jeff Royer, and gave him information on companies he believed were engaging in illegal activity. Royer used FBI databases to search for any investigations into those companies by the FBI or the SEC. Royer then funneled information on any pending investigations to Elgindy, who used that information to short sell the stock. An investigation uncovered his relationship with Royer, who resigned and began working directly for Elgindy. Royer's girlfriend, FBI agent Lynn Wingate, continuing to funnel information to Elgindy. In 2002, Elgindy, Royer and Wingate were indicted for their roles in the scheme.

In 2003, the National Association of Securities Dealers (NASD) ruled that Elgindy and his firm Key West Securities "engaged in a manipulative scheme in 1997 to inflate artificially the share price of Saf T Lok, Inc. through the entering of fraudulent quotations in the NASDAQ system, selling the stock short at the artificially high prices, and then taking active steps to depress the share price of Saf T Lok through the dissemination of negative research comments."

Elgindy and Key West Securities were fined $51,000 and had their NASD memberships revoked. In 2004, the SEC reversed the ban on appeal.

In a superseding indictment issued in January 2005, Elgindy was charged with racketeering, securities fraud and other crimes. This included his scheme to steal information about FBI and separate SEC investigations of various companies. After a four-month trial, Elgindy was convicted of insider trading in five stocks with illegal gains totaling about $66,000.

Elgindy was sentenced to 11 years in federal prison. He was released in late 2013 after serving almost seven years. He committed suicide on July 23, 2015.
