= The Frackers =

The Frackers: The Outrageous Inside Story of the New Billionaire Wildcatters
- Hardcover edition
- Author: Gregory Zuckerman
- Language: English
- Subject: Shale oil
- Genre: Non-fiction
- Publisher: Portfolio
- Publication date: November 5, 2013
- Publication place: United States
- Media type: Print, e-book
- Pages: 416 pages
- ISBN: 978-1591846451
- Preceded by: The Greatest Trade Ever (2010)

The Frackers: The Outrageous Inside Story of the New Billionaire Wildcatters is the second non-fiction book by the American journalist Gregory Zuckerman. It was released by Portfolio Publishing on November 5, 2013. The book was a national bestseller and was named among the best books of 2014 by The Financial Times and Forbes Magazine and as book of the year by the New York Financial Writers Association. Greg discussed the book on C-Span in 2014, after its release.

== Reception ==
Steve Banker of Forbes commented "This is a book that could have been deadly dull. But the writer, Gregory Zuckerman, an experienced business journalist, did a good job of mixing the technological developments, politics, and economics of this business with a mostly entertaining narrative of the entrepreneurs who built this business and made billions in the process."
