= Michael Burry =

American hedge fund manager (born 1971)

- Born: Michael James Burry; June 19, 1971 (age 55); San Jose, California, U.S.
- Education: University of California, Los Angeles (BA); Vanderbilt University (MD)
- Occupations: Investor; hedge fund manager
- Known for: Portrayal in The Big Short; Founding and managing Scion Asset Management
- Children: 2

Michael James Burry (/ˈbɜːri/; born June 19, 1971) is an American investor, hedge fund manager, and licensed physician. He founded the hedge fund Scion Capital, which later went by the name Scion Asset Management. In November 2025, Burry announced he was shutting down Scion Asset Management; he then launched the Substack newsletter Cassandra Unchained on November 23.

He is best known for being among the first investors to predict and profit from the subprime mortgage crisis, which contributed to the 2008 financial crisis, and was later depicted in the 2015 film The Big Short.

== Early life and education ==
Burry was born and raised in San Jose, California. At the age of two, he lost his left eye to retinoblastoma and has had a prosthetic eye ever since. As a teenager, he attended the public Santa Teresa High School. He studied economics and pre-med at the University of California, Los Angeles (UCLA), and earned an MD degree from the Vanderbilt University School of Medicine in 1997. After graduating, he would partially complete his residency in neurology at Stanford University Medical Center. While off duty, he spent time working on his hobby, financial investing. Despite not practicing, Burry has kept his license as a physician active with the Medical Board of California (MBC), including continuing education requirements.

== Investment career ==
After medical school, Burry worked as a Stanford Hospital neurology resident, and then a Stanford Hospital pathology resident, although he completed neither residency. He then left to start his own hedge fund. He had already developed a reputation as an investor by demonstrating success in value investing, which he wrote about on message boards on the stock discussion site Silicon Investor beginning in 1996. He was so successful with his stock picks that he attracted the interest of companies such as Vanguard, White Mountains Insurance Group, and prominent investors such as Joel Greenblatt. Burry has a strictly traditional understanding of value. He has said more than once that his investment style is built upon Benjamin Graham and David Dodd's 1934 book Security Analysis: "All my stock picking is 100% based on the concept of a margin of safety."

Burry was reported as taking a short position in Amazon on February 21, 2000, in the SF Chronicle, which he touted in 2025 when announcing a newsletter to lay out his AI bubble fears. Amazon would lose about 80% of its value over the next year amid the dot-com bubble. After shutting down his website in November 2000, Burry started the hedge fund Scion Capital, funded by an inheritance and loans from his family. He named it after Terry Brooks' The Scions of Shannara (1990), one of his favorite novels. He quickly earned extraordinary profits for his investors.

=== 2008 financial crisis predictions ===
In 2005, Burry started to focus on the subprime market. Through his analysis of mortgage lending practices in 2003 and 2004, he correctly predicted that the real estate bubble would collapse as early as 2007. His research on the values of residential real estate convinced him that subprime mortgages, especially those with "teaser" rates, and the bonds based on these mortgages, would begin losing value when the original rates were replaced by much higher rates, often in as little as two years after initiation. This conclusion led him to short the market by persuading Goldman Sachs and other investment firms to sell him credit default swaps against subprime deals he saw as vulnerable.

During his payments toward the credit default swaps, Burry suffered an investor revolt, where some investors in his fund worried his predictions were inaccurate and demanded to withdraw their capital. Eventually, Burry's analysis proved correct: He made a personal profit of $100 million and a profit for his remaining investors of more than $700 million. In 2008, following the investor revolt and his subsequent financial victory, Burry shut down Scion Capital. In an April 3, 2010 op-ed for The New York Times, Burry argued that anyone who studied the financial markets carefully in 2003, 2004, and 2005 could have recognized the growing risk in the subprime markets. He faulted federal regulators for failing to listen to warnings from outside a closed circle of advisors.

=== After the financial crisis ===
In 2013, Burry reopened the Scion hedge fund under the name Scion Asset Management. Its aim was to generate personal investments, which include water, farmland, and gold. In 2021, Burry had been an investor in GameStop before it became a meme stock on Reddit and its value skyrocketed and then dropped in the GameStop short squeeze. However, he said he had sold the stock before its dramatic ascent. As of January 2026, Burry said he was buying GameStop shares again, but that he was not betting on more meme-stock mania.

Also in 2021, Burry raised concerns regarding the hype around meme stocks, electric vehicles, software-as-a-service companies, and bitcoin, making comparisons to the dot-com bubble. The meme stock and crypto markets would later collapse, and he has continued to criticize cryptocurrencies. In February 2026, he released a chart comparing the bearish bitcoin state to the 2021–2022 plunge, suggesting the possibility of a deeper reset.

In 2025, Burry's 13-F filings revealed short positions in Nvidia and Palantir, in the forms of put options, another position contrary to general market consensus. This sparked public interest online, as he was once again taking a short, opposing position, to the general market. In further filings, Burry has withdrawn Scion Asset Management from the SEC's registration, effectively closing down his fund. In late 2025, Burry deregistered his hedge fund, Scion Asset Management. In a post on X in late November, Burry said "On to much better things Nov 25th" and the SEC database showed Scion's registration status as terminated. On November 24, 2025, he would announce a newsletter with a $379 annual fee (now $439/yr), Cassandra Unchained, which will lay out his fears about an AI bubble related to his short positions in Nvidia and Palantir.

In March 2026, Burry agreed with billionaire Bill Ackman's bullish call on Fannie Mae and Freddie Mac. Burry also posted on X about the stagnation of America's housing market, where he pushed back on the U.S. housing shortage narrative, saying that the issue is misallocation, not supply. He also critiqued federal policy and called for reform to Fannie Mae and Freddie Mac. In April 2026, Burry shared a post by George Noble, a former Fidelity fund manager with over four decades on Wall Street, which criticized the proposal of Elon Musk's SpaceX being added to the Nasdaq-100 index, calling it "the most SHAMELESS structural manipulation of a major index I've ever seen". Burry shared Noble's critique with his more than one million followers on X, calling it a "must read" because the stock could be added to 401(k)s within a few weeks of being listed on the Nasdaq.

In September 2026, Burry replaced several short positions in AI-related stocks with put options, including positions tied to Micron, Nebius, Palantir and the iShares Semiconductor ETF.

== Personal life ==
Burry is married and lives in Saratoga, California, with his two adult sons, one of whom was diagnosed with Asperger syndrome. Burry believes he also has Asperger's after reading about the condition. Burry was highly critical of the lockdowns during the COVID-19 pandemic in the United States.

== In popular culture ==
=== Film ===
- Burry was portrayed by Christian Bale in the 2015 film The Big Short.

=== Literature ===
- 2009: Gregory Zuckerman, The Greatest Trade Ever
- 2010: Michael Lewis, The Big Short
