= David Bale =

English entrepreneur and environmentalist (1941–2003)

- Bale in March 2003
- Born: David Charles Howard Bale; 2 September 1941; Witbank, South Africa
- Died: 30 December 2003 (aged 62); Santa Monica, California, US
- Citizenship: United Kingdom
- Occupation: Entrepreneur
- Movement: Animal rights
- Spouse(s): Sandra Kreunen (div. 1964) Jenny James (m. 1972; div. 1991) Gloria Steinem (m. 2000)
- Children: 4, including Christian

David Charles Howard Bale (2 September 1941 – 30 December 2003) was an English entrepreneur, environmentalist, and animal welfare activist. He was the father of actor Christian Bale and the husband of Gloria Steinem.

== Early life and background ==
Bale was born in South Africa. His father Philip Bale served as a Royal Air Force pilot. Bale grew up in England, Egypt and the Channel Islands. He initially pursued a career as a commercial pilot and later ran a commuter airline in England. His business activities included marketing imported jeans and skateboards.

== Career ==
Bale was an activist for environmental and animal rights causes. He served as a board member of The Dian Fossey Gorilla Fund and the Ark Trust, which in 2002 became the Hollywood branch of the Humane Society of the United States. He also served as a board member for World Education, Inc., an international non-profit organisation known for its work in educational development, located in Boston, Massachusetts.

== Personal life ==
Bale was married three times. His first marriage to Sandra Kreunen in South Africa ended in 1964 after she filed for divorce when he returned to England to visit his mother. His second marriage to Jenny James in England also ended in divorce. From his first marriage, he had a daughter and from his second marriage, he had three children including Christian Bale.

On 3 September 2000, Bale married the feminist writer, journalist, and social-political activist Gloria Steinem. Their wedding in Oklahoma was a private ceremony at the home of her friend Wilma Mankiller, the first female Principal Chief of the Cherokee Nation. Bale had been facing deportation after overstaying his visa. Both Steinem and Bale denied that Bale's immigration status was the motivation for the marriage.

Steinem had previously been critical of the institution of marriage, saying that "marriage was the model for slavery law in this country". She said of her change in attitude, 'I didn't change. Marriage changed. We spent 30 years in the United States changing the marriage laws. If I had married when I was supposed to get married, I would have lost my name, my legal residence, my credit rating, many of my civil rights. That's not true any more. It's possible to make an equal marriage'.

== Death ==
Bale died of brain lymphoma on 30 December 2003, aged 62.

== Filmography ==
Year	Title	Role	Notes
1987	Little Dorrit		
