= Kirsten Grind =

American journalist and author

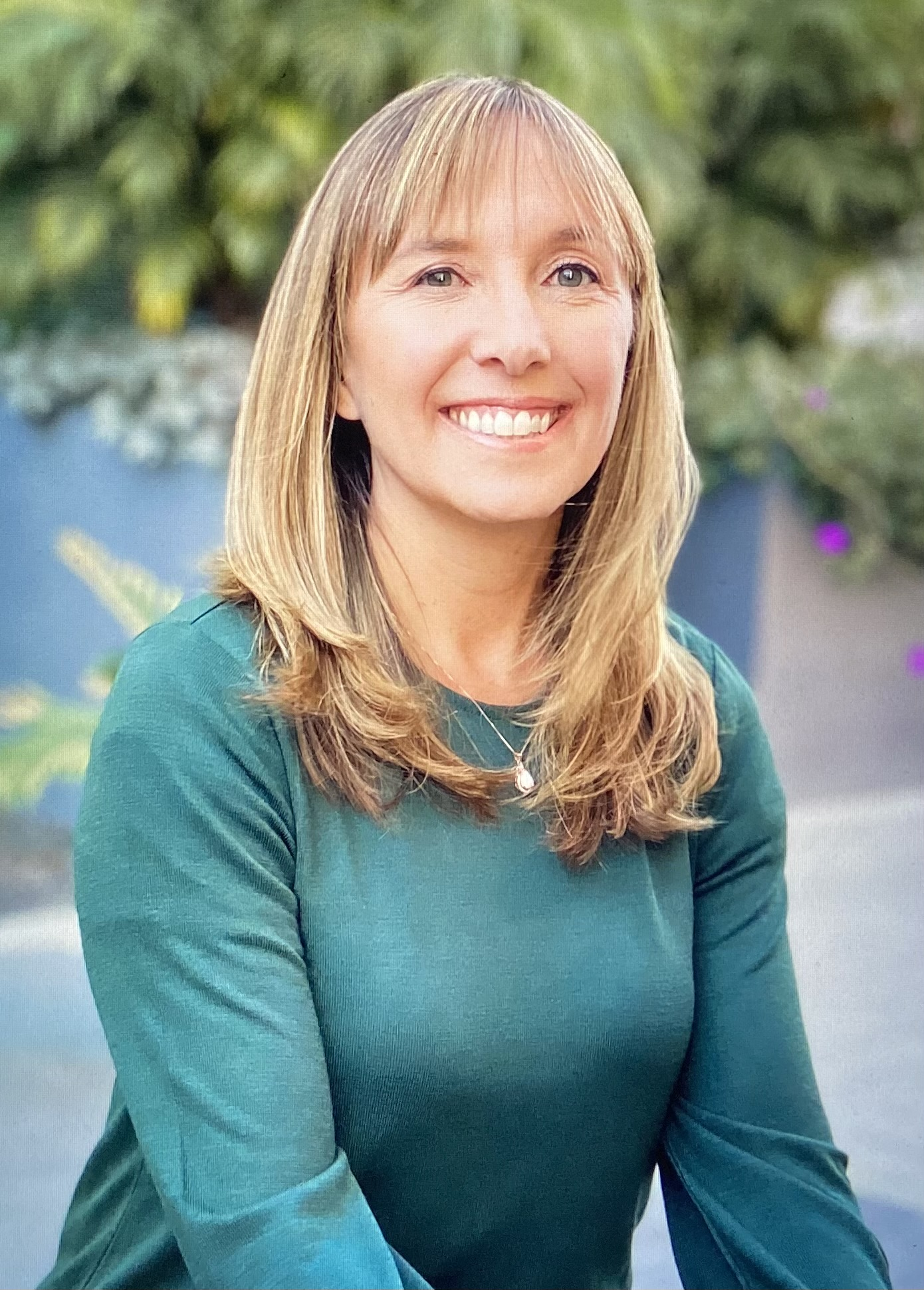

Kirsten Grind (née Kirsten Orsini-Meinhard) is an American journalist and author. She is an investigative reporter for The Wall Street Journal in San Francisco, the co-author of the book Happy At Any Cost, The Revolutionary Vision and Fatal Quest of Zappos CEO Tony Hsieh (Simon & Schuster, March 2022), and The Lost Bank: The Story of Washington Mutual—The Biggest Bank Failure in American History (Simon & Schuster, June 2012).

== Career ==
Kirsten Grind is a reporter for The Wall Street Journal, where she has worked for ten years. At the WSJ, she primarily covers the tech industry and has won a series of awards for her work, including exposing screening gaps at the childcare website Care.com, showing how Google's secretive algorithm works, and others. She has written an in-depth profile of Twitter's former CEO Jack Dorsey, detailed a stalking scandal at eBay, and most recently has chronicled the mishandling of sexual harassment allegations at the video game giant Activision Blizzard. Earlier in her career at the WSJ, she was an enterprise finance reporter based in New York, where she exposed the flawed rating system of popular mutual funds, chronicled the downfall of the bond king, Bill Gross, uncovered a sexual harassment scandal at the mutual fund giant Fidelity Investments and exposed a fast-growing, predatory green-energy loan program that took advantage of the elderly.

Previously, she was the banking reporter at the Puget Sound Business Journal in Seattle, where she wrote a series of investigative stories about the collapse of Washington Mutual, the largest bank failure in U.S. history. Those stories, along with an in-depth series on the foreclosure crisis, garnered a Pulitzer Finalist citation in 2010, along with numerous other national awards.

== Happy at Any Cost ==
Grind's second book, Happy at Any Cost, The Revolutionary Vision and Fatal Quest of Zappos CEO Tony Hsieh, co-written with Katherine Sayre, was published March 15, 2022 by Simon and Schuster.

== The Lost Bank ==
Grind's book, The Lost Bank, was released on June 12, 2012. It is published by Simon & Schuster. The book was named the best investigative book of 2012 by Investigative Reporters & Editors (IRE).

== Awards ==
Grind and her colleague Gregory Zuckerman won the Gerald Loeb Award in 2015 in the category of Breaking News for their series on PIMCO and the downfall of the "bond king" Bill Gross.

Grind was cited as a finalist for the Pulitzer Prize in Explanatory Reporting in 2010. She was also a finalist for the Gerald Loeb Award in 2010 for her coverage of the collapse of Washington Mutual, and earned the 2015 Gerald Loeb Award for Breaking News for "Abdication of the 'Bond King'." She has won numerous other national awards including from the Society of Professional Journalists and from SABEW (Society of American Business Editors and Writers).
