= The Greatest Trade Ever =

2009 book by Gregory Zuckerman

The Greatest Trade Ever: The Behind-the-Scenes Story of How John Paulson Defied Wall Street and Made Financial History
- Hardcover edition
- Author: Gregory Zuckerman
- Language: English
- Subject: 2008 financial crisis, Subprime mortgage crisis
- Genre: Non-fiction
- Publisher: Crown Business
- Publication date: November 3, 2009
- Publication place: United States
- Media type: Print, e-book
- Pages: 320 pages
- ISBN: 978-0385529945
- OCLC: 651902245
- Followed by: The Frackers (2013)

The Greatest Trade Ever: The Behind-the-Scenes Story of How John Paulson Defied Wall Street and Made Financial History is a debut non-fiction book by American journalist Gregory Zuckerman. The book was released on November 3, 2009, by Crown Business. The book investigates the reasons and consequences of the subprime mortgage crisis and the role that hedge fund manager John Paulson played in those events.

== Overview ==
In 2006, John Paulson organized Paulson Credit Opportunity Fund that bet against bonds backed by subprime mortgages using credit default swaps. Paulson "shot to fame and fortune" when his investment strategies paid off during the subprime housing market crash. His bet against the subprime mortgage bubble has been called "the greatest trade ever" by Gregory Zuckerman. Paulson's involvement in the Abacus-2007AC1 deals resulted in Goldman Sachs paying a $550 million penalty, the largest ever paid by a Wall Street firm.

== Recognition ==
The Greatest Trade Ever became a New York Times and Wall Street Journal best-seller and has since been translated into nine languages.

== Reception ==
Heather Stewart of The Observer commented "Some of the best books about Wall Street – Michael Lewis's Liar's Poker, and Roger Lowenstein's When Genius Failed, for example – are packed with larger-than-life characters whom we end up either rooting for or loathing. Admittedly, Zuckerman's subjects offer him scant material, but the less-than-thrilling personal tales he recounts make this book better as a telling exposition of one aspect of the financial crisis than a gripping general read." Ben Higgins of The Independent stated "The book mentions the moral question hanging over these deals a few times, but that's not really what Zuckerman, a Wall Street Journal staffer, is interested in. He's enthralled by the magnitude of markets, financial wizardy, and the personalities who did their homework and held their nerve."

== See also ==
- The Big Short, a 2010 book by Michael Lewis
- Credit-default swap
- Collateralised debt obligation
- CDO-Squared
- Synthetic CDO
