= Gregory Zuckerman =

American journalist

Gregory S. Zuckerman (born September 7, 1966) is an American investigative journalist, bestselling author, and special writer at The Wall Street Journal. Known for his in-depth reporting on finance, energy, and biotechnology, Zuckerman has written extensively about major Wall Street trades, the fracking boom, and the development of COVID-19 vaccines. He is the author of several acclaimed nonfiction books, including The Greatest Trade Ever, The Man Who Solved the Market, and A Shot to Save the World. A three-time Gerald Loeb Award winner, Zuckerman is recognized for breaking significant financial news and profiling influential figures in business and science.

== Education and family ==
Gregory Zuckerman was born on September 7, 1966, to a Jewish-American family. He grew up in Rhode Island and graduated from Brandeis University, magna cum laude, in 1988. He now lives in New Jersey with his wife and two sons. He works at the New York City bureau of The Wall Street Journal.

== Career ==
Zuckerman started his journalism career as managing editor of Mergers and Acquisitions Report, a newsletter published by Investment Dealers' Digest. He left that position to write for the New York Post covering media companies. In 1996, Zuckerman joined The Wall Street Journal as a financial reporter.

At The Wall Street Journal, Zuckerman covered credit markets and wrote the widely read "Heard on the Street" column. As a special reporter in the Money and Investing section, he covers financial trades, hedge funds, private equity firms, the energy revolution, and other investing and business topics.

Zuckerman appears regularly on CNBC, Fox Business, Yahoo Finance, Bloomberg Television, and various television networks. He regularly appears on National Public Radio, BBC, ABC Radio, Bloomberg Radio, and radio stations around the globe. He also gives speeches to business groups on a variety of topics. During one year, he spoke to groups in New York, Los Angeles, San Francisco, Houston, Dallas, Las Vegas, Phoenix, Calgary, Montreal, and Niagara Falls.

In October 2021, he published A Shot to Save the World: The Inside Story of the Life-or-Death Race for a COVID-19 Vaccine about developing an mRNA vaccine. On November 7, 2021, he was featured in an interview with the noted virologists of This Week in Virology, TWiV.

== Awards and honors ==
Zuckerman is a three-time winner of the Gerald Loeb Award, the highest honor in business journalism. In 2015, he won the Gerald Loeb Award for Breaking News, for a series of stories revealing discord among Bill Gross, founder of bond powerhouse Pimco, and others at the firm, including Mohamed El-Erian. The stories precipitated Mr. Gross's surprise departure from Pimco.

In 2007, Zuckerman was part of a team that won the Gerald Loeb Award for Deadline Writing coverage of the collapse of hedge fund Amaranth Advisors. In 2003, he won the Gerald Loeb Award for Deadline Writing for coverage of the demise of telecom provider WorldCom. He was part of a team that won the New York Press Club Journalism award in 2008. He was a finalist for the 2008 Loeb award for coverage of the mortgage meltdown and a finalist for the 2011 Loeb award for investigative news coverage of the insider trading scandal.

He was part of a team that won the New York Press Club Journalism Award for investigative news coverage of the insider trading scandal in 2011.

Zuckerman broke the story about the trades by J. P. Morgan's London Whale in 2012.

He shared the 2015 Gerald Loeb Award for Breaking News for "Abdication of the 'Bond King'" with Kirsten Grind.

== Books ==
- The Greatest Trade Ever: The Behind-the-Scenes Story of How John Paulson Defied Wall Street and Made Financial History (2009)
- The Frackers: The Outrageous Inside Story of the New Billionaire Wildcatters (2013), examines various individuals and independent companies who pioneered the fracking process within the United States.
- Rising Above: How 11 Athletes Overcame Challenges in their Youth to Become Stars (2016), was authored by Greg Zuckerman and his two sons; it is a book for young readers and adults that describes the remarkable stories of how various athletes overcame imposing setbacks in their youth.
- Rising Above: Inspiring Women in Sports (2018), was authored by Greg Zuckerman and his sons: it is a second book for young readers.
- The Man Who Solved the Market: How Jim Simons Launched the Quant Revolution (2019), the third non-fiction adult book authored by Greg Zuckerman is about Jim Simons of Renaissance Technologies. The Man Who Solved The Market was a New York Times and Wall Street Journal best seller. It was # 1 on the New York Times list of top-selling business books for the month of November, 2019, and was shortlisted in the FT/McKinsey competition for 2019 business book of the year.
- A Shot to Save the World: The Inside Story of the Life-or-Death Race for a COVID-19 Vaccine (2021)
